

410001–410100 

|-bgcolor=#E9E9E9
| 410001 ||  || — || November 22, 2006 || 7300 Observatory || W. K. Y. Yeung || — || align=right | 1.4 km || 
|-id=002 bgcolor=#FA8072
| 410002 ||  || — || November 24, 2006 || Catalina || CSS || — || align=right | 1.5 km || 
|-id=003 bgcolor=#E9E9E9
| 410003 ||  || — || October 23, 2006 || Catalina || CSS || — || align=right | 1.2 km || 
|-id=004 bgcolor=#E9E9E9
| 410004 ||  || — || November 16, 2006 || Kitt Peak || Spacewatch || — || align=right data-sort-value="0.91" | 910 m || 
|-id=005 bgcolor=#E9E9E9
| 410005 ||  || — || November 16, 2006 || Kitt Peak || Spacewatch || — || align=right | 1.3 km || 
|-id=006 bgcolor=#E9E9E9
| 410006 ||  || — || September 27, 2006 || Mount Lemmon || Mount Lemmon Survey || — || align=right | 1.4 km || 
|-id=007 bgcolor=#E9E9E9
| 410007 ||  || — || September 27, 2006 || Mount Lemmon || Mount Lemmon Survey || — || align=right | 1.7 km || 
|-id=008 bgcolor=#E9E9E9
| 410008 ||  || — || October 31, 2006 || Mount Lemmon || Mount Lemmon Survey || — || align=right data-sort-value="0.96" | 960 m || 
|-id=009 bgcolor=#E9E9E9
| 410009 ||  || — || November 18, 2006 || Kitt Peak || Spacewatch || (5) || align=right data-sort-value="0.84" | 840 m || 
|-id=010 bgcolor=#E9E9E9
| 410010 ||  || — || November 18, 2006 || Kitt Peak || Spacewatch || — || align=right | 1.3 km || 
|-id=011 bgcolor=#E9E9E9
| 410011 ||  || — || September 28, 2006 || Mount Lemmon || Mount Lemmon Survey || (5) || align=right data-sort-value="0.78" | 780 m || 
|-id=012 bgcolor=#E9E9E9
| 410012 ||  || — || October 19, 2006 || Mount Lemmon || Mount Lemmon Survey || — || align=right | 1.4 km || 
|-id=013 bgcolor=#E9E9E9
| 410013 ||  || — || November 18, 2006 || Kitt Peak || Spacewatch || — || align=right | 1.4 km || 
|-id=014 bgcolor=#E9E9E9
| 410014 ||  || — || October 4, 2006 || Mount Lemmon || Mount Lemmon Survey || (5) || align=right data-sort-value="0.82" | 820 m || 
|-id=015 bgcolor=#E9E9E9
| 410015 ||  || — || November 18, 2006 || Marly || Naef Obs. || — || align=right | 1.6 km || 
|-id=016 bgcolor=#E9E9E9
| 410016 ||  || — || November 20, 2006 || Kitt Peak || Spacewatch || — || align=right | 1.1 km || 
|-id=017 bgcolor=#E9E9E9
| 410017 ||  || — || November 22, 2006 || Socorro || LINEAR || — || align=right | 1.1 km || 
|-id=018 bgcolor=#E9E9E9
| 410018 ||  || — || November 22, 2006 || Mount Lemmon || Mount Lemmon Survey || GEF || align=right | 1.4 km || 
|-id=019 bgcolor=#E9E9E9
| 410019 ||  || — || November 11, 2006 || Kitt Peak || Spacewatch || — || align=right | 1.0 km || 
|-id=020 bgcolor=#E9E9E9
| 410020 ||  || — || November 23, 2006 || Kitt Peak || Spacewatch || — || align=right | 1.4 km || 
|-id=021 bgcolor=#E9E9E9
| 410021 ||  || — || November 24, 2006 || 7300 Observatory || W. K. Y. Yeung || — || align=right | 1.4 km || 
|-id=022 bgcolor=#E9E9E9
| 410022 ||  || — || November 25, 2006 || Mount Lemmon || Mount Lemmon Survey || JUN || align=right data-sort-value="0.86" | 860 m || 
|-id=023 bgcolor=#E9E9E9
| 410023 ||  || — || November 19, 2006 || Kitt Peak || Spacewatch || — || align=right | 1.1 km || 
|-id=024 bgcolor=#E9E9E9
| 410024 ||  || — || November 27, 2006 || Mount Lemmon || Mount Lemmon Survey || — || align=right | 1.5 km || 
|-id=025 bgcolor=#E9E9E9
| 410025 ||  || — || December 12, 2006 || Eskridge || Farpoint Obs. || — || align=right data-sort-value="0.98" | 980 m || 
|-id=026 bgcolor=#E9E9E9
| 410026 ||  || — || December 9, 2006 || Kitt Peak || Spacewatch || — || align=right | 1.1 km || 
|-id=027 bgcolor=#E9E9E9
| 410027 ||  || — || November 16, 2006 || Mount Lemmon || Mount Lemmon Survey || — || align=right | 1.6 km || 
|-id=028 bgcolor=#E9E9E9
| 410028 ||  || — || September 27, 2006 || Mount Lemmon || Mount Lemmon Survey || ADE || align=right | 2.7 km || 
|-id=029 bgcolor=#E9E9E9
| 410029 ||  || — || November 14, 2006 || Mount Lemmon || Mount Lemmon Survey || — || align=right | 2.0 km || 
|-id=030 bgcolor=#E9E9E9
| 410030 ||  || — || November 11, 2006 || Kitt Peak || Spacewatch || — || align=right | 1.3 km || 
|-id=031 bgcolor=#E9E9E9
| 410031 ||  || — || December 10, 2006 || Kitt Peak || Spacewatch || — || align=right data-sort-value="0.91" | 910 m || 
|-id=032 bgcolor=#E9E9E9
| 410032 ||  || — || November 22, 2006 || Socorro || LINEAR || — || align=right data-sort-value="0.93" | 930 m || 
|-id=033 bgcolor=#E9E9E9
| 410033 ||  || — || December 15, 2006 || Mount Lemmon || Mount Lemmon Survey || EUN || align=right | 1.3 km || 
|-id=034 bgcolor=#E9E9E9
| 410034 ||  || — || November 22, 2006 || Mount Lemmon || Mount Lemmon Survey || — || align=right | 2.2 km || 
|-id=035 bgcolor=#E9E9E9
| 410035 ||  || — || December 14, 2006 || San Marcello || Pistoia Mountains Obs. || ADE || align=right | 1.9 km || 
|-id=036 bgcolor=#E9E9E9
| 410036 ||  || — || December 17, 2006 || Mount Lemmon || Mount Lemmon Survey || — || align=right | 2.6 km || 
|-id=037 bgcolor=#fefefe
| 410037 ||  || — || December 20, 2006 || Mount Lemmon || Mount Lemmon Survey || — || align=right data-sort-value="0.73" | 730 m || 
|-id=038 bgcolor=#d6d6d6
| 410038 ||  || — || December 20, 2006 || Mount Lemmon || Mount Lemmon Survey || — || align=right | 3.0 km || 
|-id=039 bgcolor=#E9E9E9
| 410039 ||  || — || October 31, 2006 || Mount Lemmon || Mount Lemmon Survey || — || align=right | 1.2 km || 
|-id=040 bgcolor=#E9E9E9
| 410040 ||  || — || December 9, 2006 || Kitt Peak || Spacewatch || — || align=right | 1.3 km || 
|-id=041 bgcolor=#E9E9E9
| 410041 ||  || — || December 21, 2006 || Kitt Peak || Spacewatch || — || align=right | 1.2 km || 
|-id=042 bgcolor=#E9E9E9
| 410042 ||  || — || December 13, 2006 || Kitt Peak || Spacewatch || — || align=right data-sort-value="0.94" | 940 m || 
|-id=043 bgcolor=#E9E9E9
| 410043 ||  || — || December 25, 2006 || Kitt Peak || Spacewatch || WIT || align=right | 1.3 km || 
|-id=044 bgcolor=#E9E9E9
| 410044 ||  || — || December 27, 2006 || Mount Lemmon || Mount Lemmon Survey || — || align=right | 2.2 km || 
|-id=045 bgcolor=#E9E9E9
| 410045 ||  || — || January 8, 2007 || Catalina || CSS || — || align=right | 1.3 km || 
|-id=046 bgcolor=#E9E9E9
| 410046 ||  || — || November 18, 2006 || Mount Lemmon || Mount Lemmon Survey || AEO || align=right | 1.2 km || 
|-id=047 bgcolor=#E9E9E9
| 410047 ||  || — || November 25, 2006 || Mount Lemmon || Mount Lemmon Survey || — || align=right data-sort-value="0.97" | 970 m || 
|-id=048 bgcolor=#E9E9E9
| 410048 ||  || — || January 10, 2007 || Socorro || LINEAR || — || align=right | 2.3 km || 
|-id=049 bgcolor=#E9E9E9
| 410049 ||  || — || January 14, 2007 || Bergisch Gladbach || W. Bickel || EUN || align=right | 1.5 km || 
|-id=050 bgcolor=#E9E9E9
| 410050 ||  || — || January 14, 2007 || Nyukasa || Mount Nyukasa Stn. || (5) || align=right data-sort-value="0.92" | 920 m || 
|-id=051 bgcolor=#E9E9E9
| 410051 ||  || — || December 13, 2006 || Mount Lemmon || Mount Lemmon Survey || JUN || align=right | 1.2 km || 
|-id=052 bgcolor=#E9E9E9
| 410052 ||  || — || January 15, 2007 || Anderson Mesa || LONEOS || (5) || align=right data-sort-value="0.98" | 980 m || 
|-id=053 bgcolor=#E9E9E9
| 410053 ||  || — || January 10, 2007 || Mount Lemmon || Mount Lemmon Survey || — || align=right | 1.6 km || 
|-id=054 bgcolor=#E9E9E9
| 410054 ||  || — || January 10, 2007 || Mount Lemmon || Mount Lemmon Survey || — || align=right | 1.9 km || 
|-id=055 bgcolor=#E9E9E9
| 410055 ||  || — || January 17, 2007 || Kitt Peak || Spacewatch || — || align=right | 1.5 km || 
|-id=056 bgcolor=#E9E9E9
| 410056 ||  || — || January 23, 2007 || Socorro || LINEAR || — || align=right | 2.4 km || 
|-id=057 bgcolor=#E9E9E9
| 410057 ||  || — || January 24, 2007 || Socorro || LINEAR || — || align=right | 3.2 km || 
|-id=058 bgcolor=#E9E9E9
| 410058 ||  || — || December 24, 2006 || Catalina || CSS || — || align=right | 1.6 km || 
|-id=059 bgcolor=#E9E9E9
| 410059 ||  || — || January 26, 2007 || Kitt Peak || Spacewatch || — || align=right | 2.1 km || 
|-id=060 bgcolor=#E9E9E9
| 410060 ||  || — || January 24, 2007 || Kitt Peak || Spacewatch || — || align=right | 2.0 km || 
|-id=061 bgcolor=#E9E9E9
| 410061 ||  || — || January 25, 2007 || Catalina || CSS || — || align=right | 2.6 km || 
|-id=062 bgcolor=#E9E9E9
| 410062 ||  || — || January 27, 2007 || Mount Lemmon || Mount Lemmon Survey || — || align=right | 1.5 km || 
|-id=063 bgcolor=#E9E9E9
| 410063 ||  || — || January 27, 2007 || Mount Lemmon || Mount Lemmon Survey || — || align=right | 2.2 km || 
|-id=064 bgcolor=#E9E9E9
| 410064 ||  || — || January 28, 2007 || Mayhill || A. Lowe || — || align=right | 1.4 km || 
|-id=065 bgcolor=#E9E9E9
| 410065 ||  || — || January 17, 2007 || Kitt Peak || Spacewatch || HOF || align=right | 2.9 km || 
|-id=066 bgcolor=#E9E9E9
| 410066 ||  || — || February 6, 2007 || Kitt Peak || Spacewatch || NEM || align=right | 2.2 km || 
|-id=067 bgcolor=#E9E9E9
| 410067 ||  || — || February 6, 2007 || Mount Lemmon || Mount Lemmon Survey || WIT || align=right | 1.1 km || 
|-id=068 bgcolor=#E9E9E9
| 410068 ||  || — || February 6, 2007 || Kitt Peak || Spacewatch || — || align=right | 1.9 km || 
|-id=069 bgcolor=#E9E9E9
| 410069 ||  || — || November 27, 2006 || Mount Lemmon || Mount Lemmon Survey || — || align=right | 1.2 km || 
|-id=070 bgcolor=#E9E9E9
| 410070 ||  || — || January 27, 2007 || Kitt Peak || Spacewatch || — || align=right data-sort-value="0.90" | 900 m || 
|-id=071 bgcolor=#E9E9E9
| 410071 ||  || — || February 10, 2007 || Mount Lemmon || Mount Lemmon Survey || — || align=right | 1.3 km || 
|-id=072 bgcolor=#E9E9E9
| 410072 ||  || — || February 13, 2007 || Socorro || LINEAR || GEF || align=right | 1.6 km || 
|-id=073 bgcolor=#E9E9E9
| 410073 ||  || — || February 10, 2007 || Mount Lemmon || Mount Lemmon Survey || — || align=right | 1.4 km || 
|-id=074 bgcolor=#E9E9E9
| 410074 ||  || — || February 10, 2007 || Palomar || NEAT || — || align=right | 1.7 km || 
|-id=075 bgcolor=#E9E9E9
| 410075 ||  || — || February 10, 2007 || Catalina || CSS || — || align=right | 2.1 km || 
|-id=076 bgcolor=#E9E9E9
| 410076 ||  || — || February 16, 2007 || Catalina || CSS || — || align=right | 1.6 km || 
|-id=077 bgcolor=#E9E9E9
| 410077 ||  || — || February 16, 2007 || Catalina || CSS || — || align=right | 1.6 km || 
|-id=078 bgcolor=#E9E9E9
| 410078 ||  || — || November 27, 2006 || Mount Lemmon || Mount Lemmon Survey || — || align=right | 1.5 km || 
|-id=079 bgcolor=#E9E9E9
| 410079 ||  || — || December 24, 2006 || Kitt Peak || Spacewatch || — || align=right | 1.8 km || 
|-id=080 bgcolor=#d6d6d6
| 410080 ||  || — || February 21, 2007 || Kitt Peak || Spacewatch || KOR || align=right | 1.2 km || 
|-id=081 bgcolor=#E9E9E9
| 410081 ||  || — || February 23, 2007 || Kitt Peak || Spacewatch || — || align=right | 2.2 km || 
|-id=082 bgcolor=#E9E9E9
| 410082 ||  || — || February 23, 2007 || Kitt Peak || Spacewatch || DOR || align=right | 2.5 km || 
|-id=083 bgcolor=#E9E9E9
| 410083 ||  || — || February 25, 2007 || Kitt Peak || Spacewatch || HOF || align=right | 2.8 km || 
|-id=084 bgcolor=#E9E9E9
| 410084 ||  || — || January 27, 2007 || Mount Lemmon || Mount Lemmon Survey || — || align=right | 1.8 km || 
|-id=085 bgcolor=#E9E9E9
| 410085 ||  || — || February 22, 2007 || Mount Graham || VATT || — || align=right | 1.4 km || 
|-id=086 bgcolor=#d6d6d6
| 410086 ||  || — || February 26, 2007 || Mount Lemmon || Mount Lemmon Survey || — || align=right | 2.7 km || 
|-id=087 bgcolor=#d6d6d6
| 410087 ||  || — || February 21, 2007 || Mount Lemmon || Mount Lemmon Survey || — || align=right | 2.5 km || 
|-id=088 bgcolor=#FFC2E0
| 410088 || 2007 EJ || — || March 9, 2007 || Mount Lemmon || Mount Lemmon Survey || APO +1km || align=right | 1.0 km || 
|-id=089 bgcolor=#E9E9E9
| 410089 ||  || — || March 9, 2007 || Mount Lemmon || Mount Lemmon Survey || WIT || align=right | 1.1 km || 
|-id=090 bgcolor=#d6d6d6
| 410090 ||  || — || February 23, 2007 || Mount Lemmon || Mount Lemmon Survey || — || align=right | 2.5 km || 
|-id=091 bgcolor=#d6d6d6
| 410091 ||  || — || February 25, 2007 || Mount Lemmon || Mount Lemmon Survey || KOR || align=right | 1.6 km || 
|-id=092 bgcolor=#E9E9E9
| 410092 ||  || — || March 11, 2007 || Catalina || CSS || — || align=right | 1.9 km || 
|-id=093 bgcolor=#d6d6d6
| 410093 ||  || — || February 27, 2007 || Kitt Peak || Spacewatch || — || align=right | 2.7 km || 
|-id=094 bgcolor=#d6d6d6
| 410094 ||  || — || March 9, 2007 || Kitt Peak || Spacewatch || — || align=right | 3.0 km || 
|-id=095 bgcolor=#d6d6d6
| 410095 ||  || — || March 10, 2007 || Kitt Peak || Spacewatch || — || align=right | 3.2 km || 
|-id=096 bgcolor=#d6d6d6
| 410096 ||  || — || March 11, 2007 || Kitt Peak || Spacewatch || — || align=right | 3.6 km || 
|-id=097 bgcolor=#d6d6d6
| 410097 ||  || — || March 12, 2007 || Mount Lemmon || Mount Lemmon Survey || TIR || align=right | 3.6 km || 
|-id=098 bgcolor=#d6d6d6
| 410098 ||  || — || March 11, 2007 || Mount Lemmon || Mount Lemmon Survey || — || align=right | 1.9 km || 
|-id=099 bgcolor=#d6d6d6
| 410099 ||  || — || February 26, 2007 || Mount Lemmon || Mount Lemmon Survey || — || align=right | 2.7 km || 
|-id=100 bgcolor=#d6d6d6
| 410100 ||  || — || March 13, 2007 || Mount Lemmon || Mount Lemmon Survey || LIX || align=right | 3.9 km || 
|}

410101–410200 

|-bgcolor=#d6d6d6
| 410101 ||  || — || March 13, 2007 || Mount Lemmon || Mount Lemmon Survey || EOS || align=right | 2.1 km || 
|-id=102 bgcolor=#E9E9E9
| 410102 ||  || — || March 9, 2007 || Palomar || NEAT || — || align=right | 1.2 km || 
|-id=103 bgcolor=#d6d6d6
| 410103 ||  || — || March 9, 2007 || Mount Lemmon || Mount Lemmon Survey || — || align=right | 2.8 km || 
|-id=104 bgcolor=#E9E9E9
| 410104 ||  || — || December 20, 2006 || Mount Lemmon || Mount Lemmon Survey || — || align=right | 1.8 km || 
|-id=105 bgcolor=#E9E9E9
| 410105 ||  || — || March 12, 2007 || Kitt Peak || Spacewatch || — || align=right | 2.4 km || 
|-id=106 bgcolor=#E9E9E9
| 410106 ||  || — || September 23, 2005 || Kitt Peak || Spacewatch || — || align=right | 2.1 km || 
|-id=107 bgcolor=#d6d6d6
| 410107 ||  || — || March 14, 2007 || Kitt Peak || Spacewatch || EOS || align=right | 1.9 km || 
|-id=108 bgcolor=#E9E9E9
| 410108 ||  || — || March 13, 2007 || Mount Lemmon || Mount Lemmon Survey || — || align=right | 2.3 km || 
|-id=109 bgcolor=#d6d6d6
| 410109 ||  || — || March 13, 2007 || Kitt Peak || Spacewatch || — || align=right | 2.9 km || 
|-id=110 bgcolor=#E9E9E9
| 410110 ||  || — || March 15, 2007 || Kitt Peak || Spacewatch || — || align=right | 2.0 km || 
|-id=111 bgcolor=#d6d6d6
| 410111 ||  || — || October 7, 2004 || Kitt Peak || Spacewatch || KOR || align=right | 1.6 km || 
|-id=112 bgcolor=#d6d6d6
| 410112 ||  || — || March 12, 2007 || Catalina || CSS || — || align=right | 4.0 km || 
|-id=113 bgcolor=#d6d6d6
| 410113 ||  || — || March 13, 2007 || Kitt Peak || Spacewatch || — || align=right | 2.8 km || 
|-id=114 bgcolor=#d6d6d6
| 410114 ||  || — || March 9, 2007 || Mount Lemmon || Mount Lemmon Survey || — || align=right | 2.2 km || 
|-id=115 bgcolor=#d6d6d6
| 410115 ||  || — || March 11, 2007 || Mount Lemmon || Mount Lemmon Survey || LUT || align=right | 5.1 km || 
|-id=116 bgcolor=#d6d6d6
| 410116 ||  || — || March 13, 2007 || Mount Lemmon || Mount Lemmon Survey || — || align=right | 3.8 km || 
|-id=117 bgcolor=#d6d6d6
| 410117 ||  || — || March 16, 2007 || Kitt Peak || Spacewatch || — || align=right | 2.8 km || 
|-id=118 bgcolor=#E9E9E9
| 410118 ||  || — || March 16, 2007 || Kitt Peak || Spacewatch || — || align=right | 1.3 km || 
|-id=119 bgcolor=#E9E9E9
| 410119 ||  || — || February 26, 2007 || Mount Lemmon || Mount Lemmon Survey || — || align=right | 2.3 km || 
|-id=120 bgcolor=#d6d6d6
| 410120 ||  || — || March 13, 2007 || Kitt Peak || Spacewatch || EOS || align=right | 1.9 km || 
|-id=121 bgcolor=#d6d6d6
| 410121 ||  || — || February 27, 2007 || Kitt Peak || Spacewatch || — || align=right | 2.3 km || 
|-id=122 bgcolor=#E9E9E9
| 410122 ||  || — || March 26, 2007 || Mount Lemmon || Mount Lemmon Survey || — || align=right | 2.1 km || 
|-id=123 bgcolor=#d6d6d6
| 410123 ||  || — || March 26, 2007 || Kitt Peak || Spacewatch || EOS || align=right | 2.0 km || 
|-id=124 bgcolor=#d6d6d6
| 410124 ||  || — || March 26, 2007 || Mount Lemmon || Mount Lemmon Survey || THM || align=right | 2.2 km || 
|-id=125 bgcolor=#d6d6d6
| 410125 ||  || — || March 25, 2007 || Mount Lemmon || Mount Lemmon Survey || EOS || align=right | 2.0 km || 
|-id=126 bgcolor=#d6d6d6
| 410126 ||  || — || March 13, 2007 || Kitt Peak || Spacewatch || EOS || align=right | 1.8 km || 
|-id=127 bgcolor=#d6d6d6
| 410127 ||  || — || March 26, 2007 || Kitt Peak || Spacewatch || — || align=right | 3.9 km || 
|-id=128 bgcolor=#FA8072
| 410128 ||  || — || March 13, 2007 || Kitt Peak || Spacewatch || — || align=right data-sort-value="0.82" | 820 m || 
|-id=129 bgcolor=#d6d6d6
| 410129 ||  || — || April 11, 2007 || Kitt Peak || Spacewatch || — || align=right | 2.2 km || 
|-id=130 bgcolor=#d6d6d6
| 410130 ||  || — || April 11, 2007 || Catalina || CSS || — || align=right | 4.2 km || 
|-id=131 bgcolor=#d6d6d6
| 410131 ||  || — || April 14, 2007 || Kitt Peak || Spacewatch || Tj (2.96) || align=right | 3.2 km || 
|-id=132 bgcolor=#d6d6d6
| 410132 ||  || — || April 14, 2007 || Mount Lemmon || Mount Lemmon Survey || — || align=right | 3.1 km || 
|-id=133 bgcolor=#d6d6d6
| 410133 ||  || — || April 15, 2007 || Mount Lemmon || Mount Lemmon Survey || — || align=right | 2.5 km || 
|-id=134 bgcolor=#d6d6d6
| 410134 ||  || — || April 15, 2007 || Kitt Peak || Spacewatch || — || align=right | 3.1 km || 
|-id=135 bgcolor=#fefefe
| 410135 ||  || — || April 15, 2007 || Kitt Peak || Spacewatch || — || align=right data-sort-value="0.59" | 590 m || 
|-id=136 bgcolor=#d6d6d6
| 410136 ||  || — || April 17, 2007 || Črni Vrh || Črni Vrh || EOS || align=right | 2.1 km || 
|-id=137 bgcolor=#d6d6d6
| 410137 ||  || — || April 16, 2007 || Mount Lemmon || Mount Lemmon Survey || — || align=right | 2.7 km || 
|-id=138 bgcolor=#d6d6d6
| 410138 ||  || — || April 18, 2007 || Kitt Peak || Spacewatch || — || align=right | 2.5 km || 
|-id=139 bgcolor=#d6d6d6
| 410139 ||  || — || September 16, 2003 || Kitt Peak || Spacewatch || — || align=right | 3.0 km || 
|-id=140 bgcolor=#d6d6d6
| 410140 ||  || — || April 18, 2007 || Kitt Peak || Spacewatch || — || align=right | 4.4 km || 
|-id=141 bgcolor=#d6d6d6
| 410141 ||  || — || April 18, 2007 || Mount Lemmon || Mount Lemmon Survey || — || align=right | 3.1 km || 
|-id=142 bgcolor=#d6d6d6
| 410142 ||  || — || April 18, 2007 || Kitt Peak || Spacewatch || — || align=right | 3.6 km || 
|-id=143 bgcolor=#d6d6d6
| 410143 ||  || — || April 19, 2007 || Mount Lemmon || Mount Lemmon Survey || — || align=right | 2.9 km || 
|-id=144 bgcolor=#d6d6d6
| 410144 ||  || — || April 19, 2007 || Kitt Peak || Spacewatch || EOS || align=right | 1.8 km || 
|-id=145 bgcolor=#d6d6d6
| 410145 ||  || — || April 11, 2007 || Kitt Peak || Spacewatch || — || align=right | 2.7 km || 
|-id=146 bgcolor=#d6d6d6
| 410146 ||  || — || April 15, 2007 || Kitt Peak || Spacewatch || — || align=right | 3.7 km || 
|-id=147 bgcolor=#fefefe
| 410147 ||  || — || February 23, 2007 || Catalina || CSS || H || align=right data-sort-value="0.82" | 820 m || 
|-id=148 bgcolor=#d6d6d6
| 410148 ||  || — || April 22, 2007 || Mount Lemmon || Mount Lemmon Survey || TEL || align=right | 1.6 km || 
|-id=149 bgcolor=#d6d6d6
| 410149 ||  || — || April 19, 2007 || Mount Lemmon || Mount Lemmon Survey || — || align=right | 3.0 km || 
|-id=150 bgcolor=#d6d6d6
| 410150 ||  || — || April 20, 2007 || Kitt Peak || Spacewatch || — || align=right | 3.2 km || 
|-id=151 bgcolor=#d6d6d6
| 410151 ||  || — || April 20, 2007 || Kitt Peak || Spacewatch || — || align=right | 4.9 km || 
|-id=152 bgcolor=#d6d6d6
| 410152 ||  || — || April 22, 2007 || Kitt Peak || Spacewatch || EOS || align=right | 2.7 km || 
|-id=153 bgcolor=#d6d6d6
| 410153 ||  || — || April 23, 2007 || Mount Lemmon || Mount Lemmon Survey || — || align=right | 3.6 km || 
|-id=154 bgcolor=#fefefe
| 410154 ||  || — || April 22, 2007 || Catalina || CSS || — || align=right data-sort-value="0.69" | 690 m || 
|-id=155 bgcolor=#d6d6d6
| 410155 ||  || — || April 24, 2007 || Kitt Peak || Spacewatch || — || align=right | 3.0 km || 
|-id=156 bgcolor=#d6d6d6
| 410156 ||  || — || April 19, 2007 || Mount Lemmon || Mount Lemmon Survey || — || align=right | 4.4 km || 
|-id=157 bgcolor=#d6d6d6
| 410157 ||  || — || May 9, 2007 || Mount Lemmon || Mount Lemmon Survey || EOS || align=right | 1.9 km || 
|-id=158 bgcolor=#d6d6d6
| 410158 ||  || — || May 11, 2007 || Mount Lemmon || Mount Lemmon Survey || THM || align=right | 2.3 km || 
|-id=159 bgcolor=#d6d6d6
| 410159 ||  || — || May 11, 2007 || Mount Lemmon || Mount Lemmon Survey || — || align=right | 3.4 km || 
|-id=160 bgcolor=#d6d6d6
| 410160 ||  || — || May 17, 2007 || Kitt Peak || Spacewatch || — || align=right | 3.1 km || 
|-id=161 bgcolor=#fefefe
| 410161 ||  || — || May 24, 2007 || Kitt Peak || Spacewatch || — || align=right data-sort-value="0.54" | 540 m || 
|-id=162 bgcolor=#d6d6d6
| 410162 ||  || — || June 8, 2007 || Kitt Peak || Spacewatch || Tj (2.99) || align=right | 2.8 km || 
|-id=163 bgcolor=#d6d6d6
| 410163 ||  || — || May 11, 2007 || Mount Lemmon || Mount Lemmon Survey || — || align=right | 2.8 km || 
|-id=164 bgcolor=#d6d6d6
| 410164 ||  || — || June 10, 2007 || Kitt Peak || Spacewatch || — || align=right | 2.8 km || 
|-id=165 bgcolor=#d6d6d6
| 410165 ||  || — || June 14, 2007 || Kitt Peak || Spacewatch || HYG || align=right | 2.9 km || 
|-id=166 bgcolor=#d6d6d6
| 410166 ||  || — || May 11, 2007 || Kitt Peak || Spacewatch || — || align=right | 3.3 km || 
|-id=167 bgcolor=#fefefe
| 410167 ||  || — || June 18, 2007 || Kitt Peak || Spacewatch || — || align=right data-sort-value="0.75" | 750 m || 
|-id=168 bgcolor=#fefefe
| 410168 ||  || — || July 20, 2007 || Lulin Observatory || LUSS || — || align=right data-sort-value="0.83" | 830 m || 
|-id=169 bgcolor=#fefefe
| 410169 ||  || — || August 8, 2007 || Socorro || LINEAR || — || align=right data-sort-value="0.67" | 670 m || 
|-id=170 bgcolor=#fefefe
| 410170 ||  || — || August 14, 2007 || Siding Spring || SSS || PHO || align=right | 1.0 km || 
|-id=171 bgcolor=#fefefe
| 410171 ||  || — || August 13, 2007 || Socorro || LINEAR || — || align=right | 1.0 km || 
|-id=172 bgcolor=#fefefe
| 410172 ||  || — || August 13, 2007 || Socorro || LINEAR || — || align=right | 1.0 km || 
|-id=173 bgcolor=#fefefe
| 410173 ||  || — || August 9, 2007 || Socorro || LINEAR || — || align=right data-sort-value="0.78" | 780 m || 
|-id=174 bgcolor=#fefefe
| 410174 ||  || — || December 2, 2004 || Kitt Peak || Spacewatch || NYS || align=right data-sort-value="0.66" | 660 m || 
|-id=175 bgcolor=#fefefe
| 410175 ||  || — || August 21, 2007 || Anderson Mesa || LONEOS || — || align=right data-sort-value="0.81" | 810 m || 
|-id=176 bgcolor=#fefefe
| 410176 ||  || — || August 21, 2007 || Anderson Mesa || LONEOS || — || align=right data-sort-value="0.75" | 750 m || 
|-id=177 bgcolor=#fefefe
| 410177 ||  || — || August 23, 2007 || Kitt Peak || Spacewatch || — || align=right data-sort-value="0.69" | 690 m || 
|-id=178 bgcolor=#fefefe
| 410178 ||  || — || August 22, 2007 || Socorro || LINEAR || — || align=right data-sort-value="0.68" | 680 m || 
|-id=179 bgcolor=#fefefe
| 410179 ||  || — || September 2, 2007 || Siding Spring || K. Sárneczky, L. Kiss || — || align=right data-sort-value="0.75" | 750 m || 
|-id=180 bgcolor=#fefefe
| 410180 ||  || — || September 5, 2007 || Dauban || Chante-Perdrix Obs. || — || align=right data-sort-value="0.81" | 810 m || 
|-id=181 bgcolor=#fefefe
| 410181 ||  || — || September 9, 2007 || Kitt Peak || Spacewatch || — || align=right data-sort-value="0.75" | 750 m || 
|-id=182 bgcolor=#fefefe
| 410182 ||  || — || February 24, 2006 || Kitt Peak || Spacewatch || — || align=right data-sort-value="0.74" | 740 m || 
|-id=183 bgcolor=#fefefe
| 410183 ||  || — || September 10, 2007 || Mount Lemmon || Mount Lemmon Survey || — || align=right data-sort-value="0.58" | 580 m || 
|-id=184 bgcolor=#fefefe
| 410184 ||  || — || September 10, 2007 || Mount Lemmon || Mount Lemmon Survey || — || align=right data-sort-value="0.70" | 700 m || 
|-id=185 bgcolor=#fefefe
| 410185 ||  || — || September 10, 2007 || Catalina || CSS || — || align=right | 1.0 km || 
|-id=186 bgcolor=#FA8072
| 410186 ||  || — || September 11, 2007 || Catalina || CSS || — || align=right data-sort-value="0.86" | 860 m || 
|-id=187 bgcolor=#fefefe
| 410187 ||  || — || September 2, 2007 || Catalina || CSS || — || align=right | 1.2 km || 
|-id=188 bgcolor=#fefefe
| 410188 ||  || — || September 11, 2007 || Mount Lemmon || Mount Lemmon Survey || — || align=right data-sort-value="0.80" | 800 m || 
|-id=189 bgcolor=#fefefe
| 410189 ||  || — || September 11, 2007 || Kitt Peak || Spacewatch || — || align=right data-sort-value="0.58" | 580 m || 
|-id=190 bgcolor=#fefefe
| 410190 ||  || — || September 11, 2007 || Kitt Peak || Spacewatch || V || align=right data-sort-value="0.79" | 790 m || 
|-id=191 bgcolor=#fefefe
| 410191 ||  || — || September 11, 2007 || Kitt Peak || Spacewatch || — || align=right data-sort-value="0.78" | 780 m || 
|-id=192 bgcolor=#fefefe
| 410192 ||  || — || September 12, 2007 || Mount Lemmon || Mount Lemmon Survey || — || align=right data-sort-value="0.67" | 670 m || 
|-id=193 bgcolor=#fefefe
| 410193 ||  || — || September 15, 2007 || Taunus || E. Schwab, R. Kling || — || align=right data-sort-value="0.86" | 860 m || 
|-id=194 bgcolor=#fefefe
| 410194 ||  || — || September 14, 2007 || Anderson Mesa || LONEOS || — || align=right data-sort-value="0.79" | 790 m || 
|-id=195 bgcolor=#FFC2E0
| 410195 ||  || — || September 11, 2007 || XuYi || PMO NEO || AMO || align=right data-sort-value="0.72" | 720 m || 
|-id=196 bgcolor=#fefefe
| 410196 ||  || — || September 14, 2007 || Catalina || CSS || — || align=right data-sort-value="0.82" | 820 m || 
|-id=197 bgcolor=#fefefe
| 410197 ||  || — || August 24, 2007 || Kitt Peak || Spacewatch || — || align=right data-sort-value="0.57" | 570 m || 
|-id=198 bgcolor=#fefefe
| 410198 ||  || — || April 7, 2003 || Kitt Peak || Spacewatch || — || align=right data-sort-value="0.64" | 640 m || 
|-id=199 bgcolor=#fefefe
| 410199 ||  || — || September 10, 2007 || Kitt Peak || Spacewatch || — || align=right data-sort-value="0.72" | 720 m || 
|-id=200 bgcolor=#fefefe
| 410200 ||  || — || September 10, 2007 || Kitt Peak || Spacewatch || — || align=right data-sort-value="0.69" | 690 m || 
|}

410201–410300 

|-bgcolor=#fefefe
| 410201 ||  || — || September 11, 2007 || Kitt Peak || Spacewatch || — || align=right data-sort-value="0.68" | 680 m || 
|-id=202 bgcolor=#fefefe
| 410202 ||  || — || September 13, 2007 || Kitt Peak || Spacewatch || — || align=right data-sort-value="0.72" | 720 m || 
|-id=203 bgcolor=#fefefe
| 410203 ||  || — || September 10, 2007 || Kitt Peak || Spacewatch || — || align=right data-sort-value="0.87" | 870 m || 
|-id=204 bgcolor=#fefefe
| 410204 ||  || — || September 10, 2007 || Kitt Peak || Spacewatch || — || align=right data-sort-value="0.80" | 800 m || 
|-id=205 bgcolor=#fefefe
| 410205 ||  || — || September 11, 2007 || Kitt Peak || Spacewatch || — || align=right data-sort-value="0.67" | 670 m || 
|-id=206 bgcolor=#fefefe
| 410206 ||  || — || September 11, 2007 || Kitt Peak || Spacewatch || — || align=right data-sort-value="0.82" | 820 m || 
|-id=207 bgcolor=#fefefe
| 410207 ||  || — || September 13, 2007 || Kitt Peak || Spacewatch || — || align=right data-sort-value="0.74" | 740 m || 
|-id=208 bgcolor=#fefefe
| 410208 ||  || — || September 12, 2007 || Catalina || CSS || — || align=right data-sort-value="0.76" | 760 m || 
|-id=209 bgcolor=#fefefe
| 410209 ||  || — || September 12, 2007 || Mount Lemmon || Mount Lemmon Survey || — || align=right data-sort-value="0.77" | 770 m || 
|-id=210 bgcolor=#fefefe
| 410210 ||  || — || September 13, 2007 || Anderson Mesa || LONEOS || — || align=right data-sort-value="0.70" | 700 m || 
|-id=211 bgcolor=#fefefe
| 410211 ||  || — || September 15, 2007 || Mount Lemmon || Mount Lemmon Survey || — || align=right data-sort-value="0.84" | 840 m || 
|-id=212 bgcolor=#fefefe
| 410212 ||  || — || September 15, 2007 || Mount Lemmon || Mount Lemmon Survey || — || align=right | 1.6 km || 
|-id=213 bgcolor=#fefefe
| 410213 ||  || — || September 15, 2007 || Kitt Peak || Spacewatch || — || align=right data-sort-value="0.91" | 910 m || 
|-id=214 bgcolor=#fefefe
| 410214 ||  || — || September 15, 2007 || Kitt Peak || Spacewatch || — || align=right data-sort-value="0.79" | 790 m || 
|-id=215 bgcolor=#fefefe
| 410215 ||  || — || September 13, 2007 || Mount Lemmon || Mount Lemmon Survey || (2076) || align=right data-sort-value="0.89" | 890 m || 
|-id=216 bgcolor=#fefefe
| 410216 ||  || — || September 12, 2007 || Mount Lemmon || Mount Lemmon Survey || — || align=right data-sort-value="0.92" | 920 m || 
|-id=217 bgcolor=#fefefe
| 410217 ||  || — || September 14, 2007 || Mount Lemmon || Mount Lemmon Survey || — || align=right data-sort-value="0.62" | 620 m || 
|-id=218 bgcolor=#fefefe
| 410218 ||  || — || September 14, 2007 || Mount Lemmon || Mount Lemmon Survey || — || align=right data-sort-value="0.68" | 680 m || 
|-id=219 bgcolor=#fefefe
| 410219 ||  || — || September 5, 2007 || Catalina || CSS || — || align=right | 1.2 km || 
|-id=220 bgcolor=#fefefe
| 410220 ||  || — || September 13, 2007 || Catalina || CSS || — || align=right data-sort-value="0.88" | 880 m || 
|-id=221 bgcolor=#fefefe
| 410221 ||  || — || September 12, 2007 || Catalina || CSS || — || align=right data-sort-value="0.79" | 790 m || 
|-id=222 bgcolor=#fefefe
| 410222 ||  || — || September 12, 2007 || Mount Lemmon || Mount Lemmon Survey || — || align=right data-sort-value="0.75" | 750 m || 
|-id=223 bgcolor=#fefefe
| 410223 ||  || — || September 13, 2007 || Socorro || LINEAR || — || align=right data-sort-value="0.75" | 750 m || 
|-id=224 bgcolor=#fefefe
| 410224 ||  || — || September 18, 2007 || Mount Lemmon || Mount Lemmon Survey || — || align=right data-sort-value="0.65" | 650 m || 
|-id=225 bgcolor=#fefefe
| 410225 ||  || — || September 10, 2007 || Mount Lemmon || Mount Lemmon Survey || — || align=right data-sort-value="0.95" | 950 m || 
|-id=226 bgcolor=#fefefe
| 410226 ||  || — || September 18, 2007 || Mount Lemmon || Mount Lemmon Survey || — || align=right data-sort-value="0.65" | 650 m || 
|-id=227 bgcolor=#fefefe
| 410227 ||  || — || September 25, 2007 || Mount Lemmon || Mount Lemmon Survey || — || align=right data-sort-value="0.85" | 850 m || 
|-id=228 bgcolor=#FA8072
| 410228 ||  || — || September 25, 2007 || Mount Lemmon || Mount Lemmon Survey || — || align=right | 1.00 km || 
|-id=229 bgcolor=#fefefe
| 410229 ||  || — || October 2, 2007 || Majdanak || Majdanak Obs. || — || align=right data-sort-value="0.59" | 590 m || 
|-id=230 bgcolor=#fefefe
| 410230 ||  || — || October 5, 2007 || Bisei SG Center || BATTeRS || — || align=right data-sort-value="0.74" | 740 m || 
|-id=231 bgcolor=#fefefe
| 410231 ||  || — || September 9, 2007 || Mount Lemmon || Mount Lemmon Survey || — || align=right data-sort-value="0.97" | 970 m || 
|-id=232 bgcolor=#fefefe
| 410232 ||  || — || October 4, 2007 || Catalina || CSS || — || align=right data-sort-value="0.77" | 770 m || 
|-id=233 bgcolor=#fefefe
| 410233 ||  || — || September 20, 2007 || Catalina || CSS || — || align=right data-sort-value="0.87" | 870 m || 
|-id=234 bgcolor=#fefefe
| 410234 ||  || — || March 24, 2006 || Kitt Peak || Spacewatch || — || align=right data-sort-value="0.91" | 910 m || 
|-id=235 bgcolor=#d6d6d6
| 410235 ||  || — || September 11, 2007 || Kitt Peak || Spacewatch || 7:4 || align=right | 3.6 km || 
|-id=236 bgcolor=#fefefe
| 410236 ||  || — || October 4, 2007 || Kitt Peak || Spacewatch || — || align=right data-sort-value="0.63" | 630 m || 
|-id=237 bgcolor=#fefefe
| 410237 ||  || — || October 4, 2007 || Kitt Peak || Spacewatch || — || align=right data-sort-value="0.76" | 760 m || 
|-id=238 bgcolor=#fefefe
| 410238 ||  || — || October 6, 2007 || Kitt Peak || Spacewatch || — || align=right data-sort-value="0.57" | 570 m || 
|-id=239 bgcolor=#fefefe
| 410239 ||  || — || October 6, 2007 || Kitt Peak || Spacewatch || — || align=right data-sort-value="0.66" | 660 m || 
|-id=240 bgcolor=#fefefe
| 410240 ||  || — || October 6, 2007 || Kitt Peak || Spacewatch || — || align=right data-sort-value="0.95" | 950 m || 
|-id=241 bgcolor=#d6d6d6
| 410241 ||  || — || October 7, 2007 || Mount Lemmon || Mount Lemmon Survey || EUP || align=right | 4.1 km || 
|-id=242 bgcolor=#fefefe
| 410242 ||  || — || October 7, 2007 || Kitt Peak || Spacewatch || — || align=right data-sort-value="0.78" | 780 m || 
|-id=243 bgcolor=#fefefe
| 410243 ||  || — || October 7, 2007 || Mount Lemmon || Mount Lemmon Survey || — || align=right data-sort-value="0.77" | 770 m || 
|-id=244 bgcolor=#fefefe
| 410244 ||  || — || October 7, 2007 || Mount Lemmon || Mount Lemmon Survey || V || align=right data-sort-value="0.53" | 530 m || 
|-id=245 bgcolor=#fefefe
| 410245 ||  || — || March 25, 2006 || Kitt Peak || Spacewatch || — || align=right data-sort-value="0.83" | 830 m || 
|-id=246 bgcolor=#fefefe
| 410246 ||  || — || October 7, 2007 || Catalina || CSS || V || align=right data-sort-value="0.65" | 650 m || 
|-id=247 bgcolor=#fefefe
| 410247 ||  || — || October 14, 2007 || Bergisch Gladbac || W. Bickel || — || align=right data-sort-value="0.83" | 830 m || 
|-id=248 bgcolor=#FA8072
| 410248 ||  || — || October 12, 2007 || Socorro || LINEAR || — || align=right data-sort-value="0.77" | 770 m || 
|-id=249 bgcolor=#fefefe
| 410249 ||  || — || October 7, 2007 || Mount Lemmon || Mount Lemmon Survey || — || align=right data-sort-value="0.59" | 590 m || 
|-id=250 bgcolor=#fefefe
| 410250 ||  || — || October 6, 2007 || Kitt Peak || Spacewatch || NYS || align=right data-sort-value="0.71" | 710 m || 
|-id=251 bgcolor=#fefefe
| 410251 ||  || — || October 7, 2007 || Catalina || CSS || — || align=right data-sort-value="0.81" | 810 m || 
|-id=252 bgcolor=#fefefe
| 410252 ||  || — || September 25, 2007 || Mount Lemmon || Mount Lemmon Survey || — || align=right data-sort-value="0.75" | 750 m || 
|-id=253 bgcolor=#fefefe
| 410253 ||  || — || October 7, 2007 || Catalina || CSS || — || align=right data-sort-value="0.81" | 810 m || 
|-id=254 bgcolor=#fefefe
| 410254 ||  || — || October 8, 2007 || Catalina || CSS || (2076) || align=right data-sort-value="0.74" | 740 m || 
|-id=255 bgcolor=#fefefe
| 410255 ||  || — || October 8, 2007 || Catalina || CSS || — || align=right data-sort-value="0.99" | 990 m || 
|-id=256 bgcolor=#fefefe
| 410256 ||  || — || October 8, 2007 || Catalina || CSS || — || align=right data-sort-value="0.81" | 810 m || 
|-id=257 bgcolor=#fefefe
| 410257 ||  || — || October 8, 2007 || Mount Lemmon || Mount Lemmon Survey || — || align=right data-sort-value="0.71" | 710 m || 
|-id=258 bgcolor=#fefefe
| 410258 ||  || — || October 9, 2007 || Kitt Peak || Spacewatch || (2076) || align=right data-sort-value="0.72" | 720 m || 
|-id=259 bgcolor=#fefefe
| 410259 ||  || — || October 4, 2007 || Kitt Peak || Spacewatch || — || align=right data-sort-value="0.70" | 700 m || 
|-id=260 bgcolor=#fefefe
| 410260 ||  || — || October 4, 2007 || Kitt Peak || Spacewatch || — || align=right data-sort-value="0.68" | 680 m || 
|-id=261 bgcolor=#E9E9E9
| 410261 ||  || — || October 5, 2007 || Kitt Peak || Spacewatch || — || align=right | 1.7 km || 
|-id=262 bgcolor=#fefefe
| 410262 ||  || — || September 15, 2007 || Mount Lemmon || Mount Lemmon Survey || — || align=right data-sort-value="0.65" | 650 m || 
|-id=263 bgcolor=#fefefe
| 410263 ||  || — || October 7, 2007 || Mount Lemmon || Mount Lemmon Survey || — || align=right data-sort-value="0.58" | 580 m || 
|-id=264 bgcolor=#fefefe
| 410264 ||  || — || October 6, 2007 || Socorro || LINEAR || — || align=right | 1.1 km || 
|-id=265 bgcolor=#fefefe
| 410265 ||  || — || October 8, 2007 || Kitt Peak || Spacewatch || — || align=right data-sort-value="0.82" | 820 m || 
|-id=266 bgcolor=#fefefe
| 410266 ||  || — || October 8, 2007 || Kitt Peak || Spacewatch || — || align=right | 1.2 km || 
|-id=267 bgcolor=#fefefe
| 410267 ||  || — || October 9, 2007 || Mount Lemmon || Mount Lemmon Survey || (2076) || align=right data-sort-value="0.79" | 790 m || 
|-id=268 bgcolor=#fefefe
| 410268 ||  || — || October 8, 2007 || Catalina || CSS || — || align=right data-sort-value="0.84" | 840 m || 
|-id=269 bgcolor=#fefefe
| 410269 ||  || — || October 7, 2007 || Socorro || LINEAR || — || align=right | 1.1 km || 
|-id=270 bgcolor=#fefefe
| 410270 ||  || — || January 15, 2005 || Socorro || LINEAR || — || align=right data-sort-value="0.93" | 930 m || 
|-id=271 bgcolor=#fefefe
| 410271 ||  || — || October 2, 1997 || Caussols || ODAS || — || align=right data-sort-value="0.83" | 830 m || 
|-id=272 bgcolor=#fefefe
| 410272 ||  || — || October 9, 2007 || Socorro || LINEAR || — || align=right data-sort-value="0.90" | 900 m || 
|-id=273 bgcolor=#fefefe
| 410273 ||  || — || October 7, 2007 || Kitt Peak || Spacewatch || — || align=right data-sort-value="0.91" | 910 m || 
|-id=274 bgcolor=#fefefe
| 410274 ||  || — || October 9, 2007 || Socorro || LINEAR || — || align=right data-sort-value="0.71" | 710 m || 
|-id=275 bgcolor=#fefefe
| 410275 ||  || — || September 13, 2007 || Mount Lemmon || Mount Lemmon Survey || MAS || align=right data-sort-value="0.57" | 570 m || 
|-id=276 bgcolor=#fefefe
| 410276 ||  || — || September 8, 2007 || Mount Lemmon || Mount Lemmon Survey || — || align=right data-sort-value="0.68" | 680 m || 
|-id=277 bgcolor=#fefefe
| 410277 ||  || — || October 5, 2007 || Kitt Peak || Spacewatch || — || align=right data-sort-value="0.61" | 610 m || 
|-id=278 bgcolor=#fefefe
| 410278 ||  || — || October 6, 2007 || Kitt Peak || Spacewatch || — || align=right data-sort-value="0.94" | 940 m || 
|-id=279 bgcolor=#fefefe
| 410279 ||  || — || October 8, 2007 || Mount Lemmon || Mount Lemmon Survey || — || align=right | 1.0 km || 
|-id=280 bgcolor=#fefefe
| 410280 ||  || — || October 7, 2007 || Mount Lemmon || Mount Lemmon Survey || — || align=right data-sort-value="0.76" | 760 m || 
|-id=281 bgcolor=#fefefe
| 410281 ||  || — || October 7, 2007 || Mount Lemmon || Mount Lemmon Survey || — || align=right data-sort-value="0.67" | 670 m || 
|-id=282 bgcolor=#fefefe
| 410282 ||  || — || October 8, 2007 || Mount Lemmon || Mount Lemmon Survey || NYS || align=right data-sort-value="0.61" | 610 m || 
|-id=283 bgcolor=#fefefe
| 410283 ||  || — || October 8, 2007 || Kitt Peak || Spacewatch || — || align=right | 1.0 km || 
|-id=284 bgcolor=#fefefe
| 410284 ||  || — || October 8, 2007 || Mount Lemmon || Mount Lemmon Survey || MAS || align=right data-sort-value="0.73" | 730 m || 
|-id=285 bgcolor=#fefefe
| 410285 ||  || — || September 25, 2007 || Mount Lemmon || Mount Lemmon Survey || — || align=right data-sort-value="0.87" | 870 m || 
|-id=286 bgcolor=#fefefe
| 410286 ||  || — || October 7, 2007 || Kitt Peak || Spacewatch || — || align=right data-sort-value="0.86" | 860 m || 
|-id=287 bgcolor=#fefefe
| 410287 ||  || — || October 7, 2007 || Kitt Peak || Spacewatch || — || align=right data-sort-value="0.76" | 760 m || 
|-id=288 bgcolor=#fefefe
| 410288 ||  || — || October 9, 2007 || Kitt Peak || Spacewatch || — || align=right data-sort-value="0.80" | 800 m || 
|-id=289 bgcolor=#fefefe
| 410289 ||  || — || October 8, 2007 || Kitt Peak || Spacewatch || V || align=right data-sort-value="0.69" | 690 m || 
|-id=290 bgcolor=#fefefe
| 410290 ||  || — || September 9, 2007 || Mount Lemmon || Mount Lemmon Survey || — || align=right data-sort-value="0.80" | 800 m || 
|-id=291 bgcolor=#fefefe
| 410291 ||  || — || October 9, 2007 || Mount Lemmon || Mount Lemmon Survey || — || align=right data-sort-value="0.73" | 730 m || 
|-id=292 bgcolor=#fefefe
| 410292 ||  || — || October 8, 2007 || Mount Lemmon || Mount Lemmon Survey || — || align=right data-sort-value="0.67" | 670 m || 
|-id=293 bgcolor=#fefefe
| 410293 ||  || — || October 10, 2007 || Kitt Peak || Spacewatch || NYS || align=right data-sort-value="0.63" | 630 m || 
|-id=294 bgcolor=#fefefe
| 410294 ||  || — || September 12, 2007 || Anderson Mesa || LONEOS || — || align=right data-sort-value="0.71" | 710 m || 
|-id=295 bgcolor=#fefefe
| 410295 ||  || — || October 7, 2007 || Catalina || CSS || — || align=right | 1.0 km || 
|-id=296 bgcolor=#fefefe
| 410296 ||  || — || October 11, 2007 || Kitt Peak || Spacewatch || — || align=right data-sort-value="0.96" | 960 m || 
|-id=297 bgcolor=#fefefe
| 410297 ||  || — || October 12, 2007 || Kitt Peak || Spacewatch || — || align=right data-sort-value="0.55" | 550 m || 
|-id=298 bgcolor=#fefefe
| 410298 ||  || — || October 11, 2007 || Kitt Peak || Spacewatch || — || align=right data-sort-value="0.67" | 670 m || 
|-id=299 bgcolor=#fefefe
| 410299 ||  || — || October 12, 2007 || Kitt Peak || Spacewatch || — || align=right data-sort-value="0.65" | 650 m || 
|-id=300 bgcolor=#fefefe
| 410300 ||  || — || October 13, 2007 || Mount Lemmon || Mount Lemmon Survey || — || align=right data-sort-value="0.79" | 790 m || 
|}

410301–410400 

|-bgcolor=#fefefe
| 410301 ||  || — || October 14, 2007 || Mount Lemmon || Mount Lemmon Survey || — || align=right data-sort-value="0.51" | 510 m || 
|-id=302 bgcolor=#FA8072
| 410302 ||  || — || October 9, 2007 || Anderson Mesa || LONEOS || — || align=right data-sort-value="0.98" | 980 m || 
|-id=303 bgcolor=#fefefe
| 410303 ||  || — || October 14, 2007 || Mount Lemmon || Mount Lemmon Survey || — || align=right data-sort-value="0.63" | 630 m || 
|-id=304 bgcolor=#fefefe
| 410304 ||  || — || October 14, 2007 || Mount Lemmon || Mount Lemmon Survey || — || align=right data-sort-value="0.67" | 670 m || 
|-id=305 bgcolor=#fefefe
| 410305 ||  || — || October 11, 2007 || Kitt Peak || Spacewatch || — || align=right data-sort-value="0.76" | 760 m || 
|-id=306 bgcolor=#fefefe
| 410306 ||  || — || October 14, 2007 || Kitt Peak || Spacewatch || — || align=right data-sort-value="0.67" | 670 m || 
|-id=307 bgcolor=#fefefe
| 410307 ||  || — || October 14, 2007 || Kitt Peak || Spacewatch || MAS || align=right data-sort-value="0.71" | 710 m || 
|-id=308 bgcolor=#fefefe
| 410308 ||  || — || October 15, 2007 || Catalina || CSS || — || align=right | 1.1 km || 
|-id=309 bgcolor=#fefefe
| 410309 ||  || — || September 18, 2007 || Mount Lemmon || Mount Lemmon Survey || — || align=right data-sort-value="0.62" | 620 m || 
|-id=310 bgcolor=#fefefe
| 410310 ||  || — || October 15, 2007 || Mount Lemmon || Mount Lemmon Survey || — || align=right data-sort-value="0.76" | 760 m || 
|-id=311 bgcolor=#fefefe
| 410311 ||  || — || March 17, 2005 || Kitt Peak || Spacewatch || NYS || align=right data-sort-value="0.66" | 660 m || 
|-id=312 bgcolor=#fefefe
| 410312 ||  || — || October 15, 2007 || Catalina || CSS || NYS || align=right data-sort-value="0.56" | 560 m || 
|-id=313 bgcolor=#fefefe
| 410313 ||  || — || October 13, 2007 || Catalina || CSS || — || align=right data-sort-value="0.96" | 960 m || 
|-id=314 bgcolor=#fefefe
| 410314 ||  || — || October 8, 2007 || Kitt Peak || Spacewatch || — || align=right data-sort-value="0.81" | 810 m || 
|-id=315 bgcolor=#fefefe
| 410315 ||  || — || October 8, 2007 || Mount Lemmon || Mount Lemmon Survey || (2076) || align=right data-sort-value="0.90" | 900 m || 
|-id=316 bgcolor=#fefefe
| 410316 ||  || — || October 11, 2007 || Kitt Peak || Spacewatch || — || align=right data-sort-value="0.65" | 650 m || 
|-id=317 bgcolor=#fefefe
| 410317 ||  || — || October 8, 2007 || Anderson Mesa || LONEOS || — || align=right data-sort-value="0.85" | 850 m || 
|-id=318 bgcolor=#FA8072
| 410318 ||  || — || October 12, 2007 || Catalina || CSS || — || align=right data-sort-value="0.62" | 620 m || 
|-id=319 bgcolor=#fefefe
| 410319 ||  || — || October 14, 2007 || Kitt Peak || Spacewatch || — || align=right data-sort-value="0.92" | 920 m || 
|-id=320 bgcolor=#fefefe
| 410320 ||  || — || October 8, 2007 || Catalina || CSS || — || align=right | 1.0 km || 
|-id=321 bgcolor=#fefefe
| 410321 ||  || — || October 12, 2007 || Mount Lemmon || Mount Lemmon Survey || — || align=right data-sort-value="0.77" | 770 m || 
|-id=322 bgcolor=#fefefe
| 410322 ||  || — || October 15, 2007 || Mount Lemmon || Mount Lemmon Survey || MAS || align=right data-sort-value="0.71" | 710 m || 
|-id=323 bgcolor=#fefefe
| 410323 ||  || — || October 18, 2007 || Mayhill || A. Lowe || — || align=right | 2.2 km || 
|-id=324 bgcolor=#fefefe
| 410324 ||  || — || October 20, 2007 || Siding Spring || K. Sárneczky, L. Kiss || — || align=right data-sort-value="0.94" | 940 m || 
|-id=325 bgcolor=#fefefe
| 410325 ||  || — || October 8, 2007 || Anderson Mesa || LONEOS || — || align=right data-sort-value="0.65" | 650 m || 
|-id=326 bgcolor=#FA8072
| 410326 ||  || — || October 19, 2007 || Socorro || LINEAR || — || align=right | 1.1 km || 
|-id=327 bgcolor=#fefefe
| 410327 ||  || — || October 16, 2007 || Kleť || Kleť Obs. || MAS || align=right data-sort-value="0.78" | 780 m || 
|-id=328 bgcolor=#fefefe
| 410328 ||  || — || October 16, 2007 || Kitt Peak || Spacewatch || — || align=right data-sort-value="0.66" | 660 m || 
|-id=329 bgcolor=#fefefe
| 410329 ||  || — || September 15, 2007 || Mount Lemmon || Mount Lemmon Survey || — || align=right data-sort-value="0.55" | 550 m || 
|-id=330 bgcolor=#fefefe
| 410330 ||  || — || October 9, 2007 || Mount Lemmon || Mount Lemmon Survey || — || align=right data-sort-value="0.54" | 540 m || 
|-id=331 bgcolor=#fefefe
| 410331 ||  || — || October 19, 2007 || Catalina || CSS || — || align=right data-sort-value="0.97" | 970 m || 
|-id=332 bgcolor=#fefefe
| 410332 ||  || — || October 24, 2007 || Mount Lemmon || Mount Lemmon Survey || — || align=right data-sort-value="0.92" | 920 m || 
|-id=333 bgcolor=#fefefe
| 410333 ||  || — || October 24, 2007 || Mount Lemmon || Mount Lemmon Survey || — || align=right | 1.2 km || 
|-id=334 bgcolor=#fefefe
| 410334 ||  || — || September 10, 2007 || Mount Lemmon || Mount Lemmon Survey || V || align=right data-sort-value="0.92" | 920 m || 
|-id=335 bgcolor=#fefefe
| 410335 ||  || — || October 30, 2007 || Kitt Peak || Spacewatch || — || align=right data-sort-value="0.78" | 780 m || 
|-id=336 bgcolor=#fefefe
| 410336 ||  || — || October 31, 2007 || Catalina || CSS || — || align=right data-sort-value="0.72" | 720 m || 
|-id=337 bgcolor=#fefefe
| 410337 ||  || — || October 30, 2007 || Mount Lemmon || Mount Lemmon Survey || — || align=right data-sort-value="0.70" | 700 m || 
|-id=338 bgcolor=#fefefe
| 410338 ||  || — || October 31, 2007 || Mount Lemmon || Mount Lemmon Survey || — || align=right data-sort-value="0.72" | 720 m || 
|-id=339 bgcolor=#fefefe
| 410339 ||  || — || October 31, 2007 || Mount Lemmon || Mount Lemmon Survey || — || align=right data-sort-value="0.61" | 610 m || 
|-id=340 bgcolor=#fefefe
| 410340 ||  || — || October 31, 2007 || Mount Lemmon || Mount Lemmon Survey || — || align=right data-sort-value="0.59" | 590 m || 
|-id=341 bgcolor=#fefefe
| 410341 ||  || — || September 18, 2007 || Mount Lemmon || Mount Lemmon Survey || — || align=right data-sort-value="0.78" | 780 m || 
|-id=342 bgcolor=#fefefe
| 410342 ||  || — || October 21, 2007 || Kitt Peak || Spacewatch || — || align=right data-sort-value="0.64" | 640 m || 
|-id=343 bgcolor=#fefefe
| 410343 ||  || — || October 30, 2007 || Mount Lemmon || Mount Lemmon Survey || MAS || align=right data-sort-value="0.73" | 730 m || 
|-id=344 bgcolor=#fefefe
| 410344 ||  || — || October 17, 2007 || Mount Lemmon || Mount Lemmon Survey || NYS || align=right data-sort-value="0.58" | 580 m || 
|-id=345 bgcolor=#fefefe
| 410345 ||  || — || October 2, 2003 || Kitt Peak || Spacewatch || — || align=right data-sort-value="0.80" | 800 m || 
|-id=346 bgcolor=#fefefe
| 410346 ||  || — || October 30, 2007 || Kitt Peak || Spacewatch || — || align=right data-sort-value="0.87" | 870 m || 
|-id=347 bgcolor=#fefefe
| 410347 ||  || — || October 30, 2007 || Mount Lemmon || Mount Lemmon Survey || — || align=right data-sort-value="0.61" | 610 m || 
|-id=348 bgcolor=#fefefe
| 410348 ||  || — || October 4, 2007 || Kitt Peak || Spacewatch || — || align=right data-sort-value="0.85" | 850 m || 
|-id=349 bgcolor=#fefefe
| 410349 ||  || — || October 30, 2007 || Kitt Peak || Spacewatch || — || align=right data-sort-value="0.68" | 680 m || 
|-id=350 bgcolor=#fefefe
| 410350 ||  || — || October 31, 2007 || Kitt Peak || Spacewatch || — || align=right data-sort-value="0.81" | 810 m || 
|-id=351 bgcolor=#fefefe
| 410351 ||  || — || November 3, 2007 || Dauban || Chante-Perdrix Obs. || — || align=right | 1.0 km || 
|-id=352 bgcolor=#FA8072
| 410352 ||  || — || November 2, 2007 || Kitt Peak || Spacewatch || — || align=right data-sort-value="0.87" | 870 m || 
|-id=353 bgcolor=#fefefe
| 410353 ||  || — || November 2, 2007 || Mount Lemmon || Mount Lemmon Survey || — || align=right data-sort-value="0.81" | 810 m || 
|-id=354 bgcolor=#fefefe
| 410354 ||  || — || August 22, 2007 || Anderson Mesa || LONEOS || — || align=right data-sort-value="0.81" | 810 m || 
|-id=355 bgcolor=#fefefe
| 410355 ||  || — || November 5, 2007 || Kitt Peak || Spacewatch || — || align=right data-sort-value="0.92" | 920 m || 
|-id=356 bgcolor=#fefefe
| 410356 ||  || — || November 1, 2007 || Kitt Peak || Spacewatch || ERI || align=right | 1.6 km || 
|-id=357 bgcolor=#fefefe
| 410357 ||  || — || November 1, 2007 || Kitt Peak || Spacewatch || — || align=right data-sort-value="0.79" | 790 m || 
|-id=358 bgcolor=#fefefe
| 410358 ||  || — || November 1, 2007 || Kitt Peak || Spacewatch || — || align=right data-sort-value="0.79" | 790 m || 
|-id=359 bgcolor=#fefefe
| 410359 ||  || — || November 1, 2007 || Kitt Peak || Spacewatch || — || align=right data-sort-value="0.77" | 770 m || 
|-id=360 bgcolor=#fefefe
| 410360 ||  || — || November 1, 2007 || Kitt Peak || Spacewatch || — || align=right data-sort-value="0.83" | 830 m || 
|-id=361 bgcolor=#fefefe
| 410361 ||  || — || November 1, 2007 || Kitt Peak || Spacewatch || NYS || align=right data-sort-value="0.59" | 590 m || 
|-id=362 bgcolor=#fefefe
| 410362 ||  || — || November 1, 2007 || Kitt Peak || Spacewatch || — || align=right data-sort-value="0.97" | 970 m || 
|-id=363 bgcolor=#fefefe
| 410363 ||  || — || November 1, 2007 || Kitt Peak || Spacewatch || — || align=right data-sort-value="0.90" | 900 m || 
|-id=364 bgcolor=#fefefe
| 410364 ||  || — || November 3, 2007 || Kitt Peak || Spacewatch || — || align=right data-sort-value="0.89" | 890 m || 
|-id=365 bgcolor=#fefefe
| 410365 ||  || — || October 6, 2007 || Kitt Peak || Spacewatch || NYS || align=right data-sort-value="0.63" | 630 m || 
|-id=366 bgcolor=#fefefe
| 410366 ||  || — || November 5, 2007 || Kitt Peak || Spacewatch || — || align=right data-sort-value="0.77" | 770 m || 
|-id=367 bgcolor=#fefefe
| 410367 ||  || — || November 4, 2007 || Kitt Peak || Spacewatch || NYS || align=right data-sort-value="0.67" | 670 m || 
|-id=368 bgcolor=#fefefe
| 410368 ||  || — || November 4, 2007 || Kitt Peak || Spacewatch || — || align=right data-sort-value="0.93" | 930 m || 
|-id=369 bgcolor=#fefefe
| 410369 ||  || — || October 4, 2007 || Kitt Peak || Spacewatch || NYS || align=right data-sort-value="0.51" | 510 m || 
|-id=370 bgcolor=#fefefe
| 410370 ||  || — || November 4, 2007 || Kitt Peak || Spacewatch || — || align=right data-sort-value="0.55" | 550 m || 
|-id=371 bgcolor=#fefefe
| 410371 ||  || — || November 5, 2007 || Mount Lemmon || Mount Lemmon Survey || — || align=right data-sort-value="0.78" | 780 m || 
|-id=372 bgcolor=#fefefe
| 410372 ||  || — || October 20, 2007 || Mount Lemmon || Mount Lemmon Survey || — || align=right data-sort-value="0.58" | 580 m || 
|-id=373 bgcolor=#fefefe
| 410373 ||  || — || September 15, 2007 || Mount Lemmon || Mount Lemmon Survey || — || align=right data-sort-value="0.79" | 790 m || 
|-id=374 bgcolor=#d6d6d6
| 410374 ||  || — || October 8, 2007 || Mount Lemmon || Mount Lemmon Survey || 3:2 || align=right | 4.4 km || 
|-id=375 bgcolor=#fefefe
| 410375 ||  || — || November 7, 2007 || Catalina || CSS || — || align=right | 1.0 km || 
|-id=376 bgcolor=#fefefe
| 410376 ||  || — || November 8, 2007 || Mount Lemmon || Mount Lemmon Survey || — || align=right data-sort-value="0.67" | 670 m || 
|-id=377 bgcolor=#fefefe
| 410377 ||  || — || November 9, 2007 || Kitt Peak || Spacewatch || — || align=right data-sort-value="0.84" | 840 m || 
|-id=378 bgcolor=#fefefe
| 410378 ||  || — || November 1, 2007 || Kitt Peak || Spacewatch || — || align=right data-sort-value="0.70" | 700 m || 
|-id=379 bgcolor=#fefefe
| 410379 ||  || — || November 9, 2007 || Kitt Peak || Spacewatch || — || align=right data-sort-value="0.85" | 850 m || 
|-id=380 bgcolor=#fefefe
| 410380 ||  || — || November 11, 2007 || Mount Lemmon || Mount Lemmon Survey || — || align=right data-sort-value="0.83" | 830 m || 
|-id=381 bgcolor=#fefefe
| 410381 ||  || — || September 14, 2007 || Mount Lemmon || Mount Lemmon Survey || — || align=right data-sort-value="0.78" | 780 m || 
|-id=382 bgcolor=#fefefe
| 410382 ||  || — || November 7, 2007 || Socorro || LINEAR || — || align=right data-sort-value="0.58" | 580 m || 
|-id=383 bgcolor=#fefefe
| 410383 ||  || — || October 8, 2007 || Kitt Peak || Spacewatch || NYS || align=right data-sort-value="0.51" | 510 m || 
|-id=384 bgcolor=#d6d6d6
| 410384 ||  || — || October 16, 2007 || Mount Lemmon || Mount Lemmon Survey || — || align=right | 3.0 km || 
|-id=385 bgcolor=#E9E9E9
| 410385 ||  || — || November 13, 2007 || Mount Lemmon || Mount Lemmon Survey || HNS || align=right | 1.2 km || 
|-id=386 bgcolor=#d6d6d6
| 410386 ||  || — || November 14, 2007 || Kitt Peak || Spacewatch || 3:2 || align=right | 3.3 km || 
|-id=387 bgcolor=#fefefe
| 410387 ||  || — || November 2, 2007 || Mount Lemmon || Mount Lemmon Survey || V || align=right data-sort-value="0.79" | 790 m || 
|-id=388 bgcolor=#fefefe
| 410388 ||  || — || November 11, 2007 || Mount Lemmon || Mount Lemmon Survey || MAS || align=right | 1.0 km || 
|-id=389 bgcolor=#E9E9E9
| 410389 ||  || — || November 3, 2007 || Mount Lemmon || Mount Lemmon Survey || — || align=right | 1.1 km || 
|-id=390 bgcolor=#fefefe
| 410390 ||  || — || November 8, 2007 || Catalina || CSS || — || align=right data-sort-value="0.77" | 770 m || 
|-id=391 bgcolor=#d6d6d6
| 410391 || 2007 WV || — || November 17, 2007 || La Sagra || OAM Obs. || 3:2 || align=right | 5.2 km || 
|-id=392 bgcolor=#fefefe
| 410392 ||  || — || September 14, 2007 || Mount Lemmon || Mount Lemmon Survey || — || align=right data-sort-value="0.79" | 790 m || 
|-id=393 bgcolor=#fefefe
| 410393 ||  || — || November 9, 2007 || Catalina || CSS || — || align=right data-sort-value="0.84" | 840 m || 
|-id=394 bgcolor=#fefefe
| 410394 ||  || — || November 18, 2007 || Mount Lemmon || Mount Lemmon Survey || — || align=right data-sort-value="0.84" | 840 m || 
|-id=395 bgcolor=#fefefe
| 410395 ||  || — || November 9, 2007 || Mount Lemmon || Mount Lemmon Survey || H || align=right | 1.0 km || 
|-id=396 bgcolor=#fefefe
| 410396 ||  || — || May 24, 2006 || Mount Lemmon || Mount Lemmon Survey || V || align=right data-sort-value="0.62" | 620 m || 
|-id=397 bgcolor=#fefefe
| 410397 ||  || — || November 20, 2007 || Mount Lemmon || Mount Lemmon Survey || — || align=right data-sort-value="0.92" | 920 m || 
|-id=398 bgcolor=#fefefe
| 410398 ||  || — || November 3, 2007 || Mount Lemmon || Mount Lemmon Survey || — || align=right data-sort-value="0.80" | 800 m || 
|-id=399 bgcolor=#fefefe
| 410399 ||  || — || October 20, 2003 || Kitt Peak || Spacewatch || NYS || align=right data-sort-value="0.57" | 570 m || 
|-id=400 bgcolor=#fefefe
| 410400 ||  || — || November 17, 2007 || Kitt Peak || Spacewatch || — || align=right data-sort-value="0.70" | 700 m || 
|}

410401–410500 

|-bgcolor=#fefefe
| 410401 ||  || — || November 19, 2007 || Kitt Peak || Spacewatch || — || align=right | 1.1 km || 
|-id=402 bgcolor=#fefefe
| 410402 ||  || — || December 10, 2007 || Socorro || LINEAR || — || align=right | 1.0 km || 
|-id=403 bgcolor=#fefefe
| 410403 ||  || — || December 15, 2007 || Saint-Sulpice || B. Christophe || — || align=right data-sort-value="0.76" | 760 m || 
|-id=404 bgcolor=#d6d6d6
| 410404 ||  || — || December 15, 2007 || Kitt Peak || Spacewatch || SHU3:2 || align=right | 6.4 km || 
|-id=405 bgcolor=#fefefe
| 410405 ||  || — || December 4, 2007 || Mount Lemmon || Mount Lemmon Survey || MAS || align=right data-sort-value="0.74" | 740 m || 
|-id=406 bgcolor=#fefefe
| 410406 ||  || — || December 15, 2007 || Kitt Peak || Spacewatch || NYS || align=right data-sort-value="0.64" | 640 m || 
|-id=407 bgcolor=#E9E9E9
| 410407 ||  || — || December 5, 2007 || Kitt Peak || Spacewatch || — || align=right | 1.1 km || 
|-id=408 bgcolor=#fefefe
| 410408 ||  || — || December 3, 2007 || Kitt Peak || Spacewatch || — || align=right data-sort-value="0.72" | 720 m || 
|-id=409 bgcolor=#fefefe
| 410409 ||  || — || December 16, 2007 || Mount Lemmon || Mount Lemmon Survey || — || align=right | 1.0 km || 
|-id=410 bgcolor=#fefefe
| 410410 ||  || — || December 17, 2007 || Mount Lemmon || Mount Lemmon Survey || — || align=right | 1.0 km || 
|-id=411 bgcolor=#fefefe
| 410411 ||  || — || November 3, 2007 || Mount Lemmon || Mount Lemmon Survey || V || align=right data-sort-value="0.69" | 690 m || 
|-id=412 bgcolor=#E9E9E9
| 410412 ||  || — || December 28, 2007 || Kitt Peak || Spacewatch || — || align=right | 1.3 km || 
|-id=413 bgcolor=#fefefe
| 410413 ||  || — || December 30, 2007 || Kitt Peak || Spacewatch || — || align=right data-sort-value="0.79" | 790 m || 
|-id=414 bgcolor=#E9E9E9
| 410414 ||  || — || December 31, 2007 || Kitt Peak || Spacewatch || — || align=right | 1.6 km || 
|-id=415 bgcolor=#fefefe
| 410415 ||  || — || December 16, 2007 || Socorro || LINEAR || — || align=right | 1.1 km || 
|-id=416 bgcolor=#fefefe
| 410416 ||  || — || January 12, 2008 || La Sagra || OAM Obs. || — || align=right data-sort-value="0.87" | 870 m || 
|-id=417 bgcolor=#fefefe
| 410417 ||  || — || January 10, 2008 || Mount Lemmon || Mount Lemmon Survey || — || align=right data-sort-value="0.92" | 920 m || 
|-id=418 bgcolor=#fefefe
| 410418 ||  || — || November 8, 2007 || Mount Lemmon || Mount Lemmon Survey || NYS || align=right data-sort-value="0.73" | 730 m || 
|-id=419 bgcolor=#fefefe
| 410419 ||  || — || January 10, 2008 || Kitt Peak || Spacewatch || — || align=right data-sort-value="0.85" | 850 m || 
|-id=420 bgcolor=#fefefe
| 410420 ||  || — || January 10, 2008 || Mount Lemmon || Mount Lemmon Survey || — || align=right data-sort-value="0.65" | 650 m || 
|-id=421 bgcolor=#E9E9E9
| 410421 ||  || — || December 19, 2007 || Mount Lemmon || Mount Lemmon Survey || EUN || align=right | 1.2 km || 
|-id=422 bgcolor=#E9E9E9
| 410422 ||  || — || January 10, 2008 || Kitt Peak || Spacewatch || — || align=right | 1.1 km || 
|-id=423 bgcolor=#fefefe
| 410423 ||  || — || January 11, 2008 || Kitt Peak || Spacewatch || — || align=right | 1.0 km || 
|-id=424 bgcolor=#fefefe
| 410424 ||  || — || January 11, 2008 || Catalina || CSS || — || align=right data-sort-value="0.86" | 860 m || 
|-id=425 bgcolor=#fefefe
| 410425 ||  || — || December 30, 2007 || Kitt Peak || Spacewatch || — || align=right data-sort-value="0.77" | 770 m || 
|-id=426 bgcolor=#fefefe
| 410426 ||  || — || January 15, 2008 || Kitt Peak || Spacewatch || MAS || align=right data-sort-value="0.66" | 660 m || 
|-id=427 bgcolor=#fefefe
| 410427 ||  || — || November 11, 2007 || Mount Lemmon || Mount Lemmon Survey || — || align=right data-sort-value="0.89" | 890 m || 
|-id=428 bgcolor=#E9E9E9
| 410428 ||  || — || January 29, 2008 || Jarnac || Jarnac Obs. || ADE || align=right | 3.4 km || 
|-id=429 bgcolor=#fefefe
| 410429 ||  || — || December 30, 2007 || Catalina || CSS || — || align=right | 1.1 km || 
|-id=430 bgcolor=#E9E9E9
| 410430 ||  || — || December 17, 2007 || Kitt Peak || Spacewatch || (5) || align=right | 1.0 km || 
|-id=431 bgcolor=#fefefe
| 410431 ||  || — || January 30, 2008 || Kitt Peak || Spacewatch || NYS || align=right data-sort-value="0.66" | 660 m || 
|-id=432 bgcolor=#fefefe
| 410432 ||  || — || October 23, 1995 || Kitt Peak || Spacewatch || — || align=right data-sort-value="0.72" | 720 m || 
|-id=433 bgcolor=#fefefe
| 410433 ||  || — || January 30, 2008 || Mount Lemmon || Mount Lemmon Survey || MAS || align=right data-sort-value="0.90" | 900 m || 
|-id=434 bgcolor=#fefefe
| 410434 ||  || — || January 30, 2008 || Mount Lemmon || Mount Lemmon Survey || MAS || align=right data-sort-value="0.76" | 760 m || 
|-id=435 bgcolor=#fefefe
| 410435 ||  || — || January 30, 2008 || Catalina || CSS || — || align=right | 1.0 km || 
|-id=436 bgcolor=#E9E9E9
| 410436 ||  || — || January 18, 2008 || Kitt Peak || Spacewatch || — || align=right | 1.5 km || 
|-id=437 bgcolor=#fefefe
| 410437 ||  || — || January 30, 2008 || Catalina || CSS || NYS || align=right data-sort-value="0.75" | 750 m || 
|-id=438 bgcolor=#E9E9E9
| 410438 ||  || — || January 31, 2008 || Mount Lemmon || Mount Lemmon Survey || — || align=right | 1.4 km || 
|-id=439 bgcolor=#fefefe
| 410439 ||  || — || January 16, 2008 || Mount Lemmon || Mount Lemmon Survey || — || align=right data-sort-value="0.98" | 980 m || 
|-id=440 bgcolor=#fefefe
| 410440 ||  || — || December 31, 2007 || Kitt Peak || Spacewatch || — || align=right data-sort-value="0.85" | 850 m || 
|-id=441 bgcolor=#E9E9E9
| 410441 ||  || — || February 3, 2008 || Kitt Peak || Spacewatch || (5) || align=right data-sort-value="0.70" | 700 m || 
|-id=442 bgcolor=#E9E9E9
| 410442 ||  || — || February 1, 2008 || Kitt Peak || Spacewatch || — || align=right | 1.8 km || 
|-id=443 bgcolor=#E9E9E9
| 410443 ||  || — || February 2, 2008 || Kitt Peak || Spacewatch || — || align=right data-sort-value="0.78" | 780 m || 
|-id=444 bgcolor=#fefefe
| 410444 ||  || — || February 2, 2008 || Kitt Peak || Spacewatch || — || align=right data-sort-value="0.85" | 850 m || 
|-id=445 bgcolor=#E9E9E9
| 410445 ||  || — || February 7, 2008 || Kitt Peak || Spacewatch || — || align=right | 1.5 km || 
|-id=446 bgcolor=#E9E9E9
| 410446 ||  || — || February 8, 2008 || Mount Lemmon || Mount Lemmon Survey || MIS || align=right | 2.6 km || 
|-id=447 bgcolor=#E9E9E9
| 410447 ||  || — || February 7, 2008 || Catalina || CSS || — || align=right | 1.1 km || 
|-id=448 bgcolor=#E9E9E9
| 410448 ||  || — || February 10, 2008 || Taunus || R. Kling, U. Zimmer || — || align=right data-sort-value="0.98" | 980 m || 
|-id=449 bgcolor=#E9E9E9
| 410449 ||  || — || February 7, 2008 || Kitt Peak || Spacewatch || — || align=right | 1.2 km || 
|-id=450 bgcolor=#fefefe
| 410450 ||  || — || February 7, 2008 || Mount Lemmon || Mount Lemmon Survey || — || align=right data-sort-value="0.65" | 650 m || 
|-id=451 bgcolor=#E9E9E9
| 410451 ||  || — || November 11, 2006 || Mount Lemmon || Mount Lemmon Survey || — || align=right | 1.5 km || 
|-id=452 bgcolor=#fefefe
| 410452 ||  || — || January 18, 2008 || Mount Lemmon || Mount Lemmon Survey || — || align=right data-sort-value="0.93" | 930 m || 
|-id=453 bgcolor=#E9E9E9
| 410453 ||  || — || February 9, 2008 || Kitt Peak || Spacewatch || EUN || align=right | 1.5 km || 
|-id=454 bgcolor=#E9E9E9
| 410454 ||  || — || December 5, 2007 || Mount Lemmon || Mount Lemmon Survey || — || align=right | 1.9 km || 
|-id=455 bgcolor=#E9E9E9
| 410455 ||  || — || February 7, 2008 || Mount Lemmon || Mount Lemmon Survey || — || align=right | 2.4 km || 
|-id=456 bgcolor=#E9E9E9
| 410456 ||  || — || February 7, 2008 || Mount Lemmon || Mount Lemmon Survey || MAR || align=right | 1.1 km || 
|-id=457 bgcolor=#E9E9E9
| 410457 ||  || — || February 8, 2008 || Kitt Peak || Spacewatch || — || align=right | 1.5 km || 
|-id=458 bgcolor=#fefefe
| 410458 ||  || — || February 9, 2008 || Anderson Mesa || LONEOS || — || align=right data-sort-value="0.94" | 940 m || 
|-id=459 bgcolor=#E9E9E9
| 410459 ||  || — || January 30, 2008 || Kitt Peak || Spacewatch || — || align=right | 1.1 km || 
|-id=460 bgcolor=#E9E9E9
| 410460 ||  || — || February 9, 2008 || Kitt Peak || Spacewatch || — || align=right | 1.3 km || 
|-id=461 bgcolor=#E9E9E9
| 410461 ||  || — || February 6, 2008 || Catalina || CSS || JUN || align=right | 1.1 km || 
|-id=462 bgcolor=#E9E9E9
| 410462 ||  || — || February 8, 2008 || Catalina || CSS || — || align=right | 3.0 km || 
|-id=463 bgcolor=#E9E9E9
| 410463 ||  || — || February 9, 2008 || Catalina || CSS || — || align=right | 1.1 km || 
|-id=464 bgcolor=#E9E9E9
| 410464 ||  || — || December 20, 2007 || Mount Lemmon || Mount Lemmon Survey || EUN || align=right | 1.4 km || 
|-id=465 bgcolor=#fefefe
| 410465 ||  || — || February 1, 2008 || Kitt Peak || Spacewatch || H || align=right data-sort-value="0.66" | 660 m || 
|-id=466 bgcolor=#E9E9E9
| 410466 ||  || — || February 13, 2008 || Mount Lemmon || Mount Lemmon Survey || — || align=right | 2.2 km || 
|-id=467 bgcolor=#E9E9E9
| 410467 ||  || — || February 9, 2008 || Kitt Peak || Spacewatch || — || align=right | 1.2 km || 
|-id=468 bgcolor=#E9E9E9
| 410468 ||  || — || February 13, 2008 || Kitt Peak || Spacewatch || EUN || align=right | 1.4 km || 
|-id=469 bgcolor=#E9E9E9
| 410469 ||  || — || February 10, 2008 || Kitt Peak || Spacewatch || GEF || align=right | 1.1 km || 
|-id=470 bgcolor=#fefefe
| 410470 ||  || — || February 7, 2008 || Kitt Peak || Spacewatch || — || align=right data-sort-value="0.81" | 810 m || 
|-id=471 bgcolor=#fefefe
| 410471 ||  || — || February 12, 2008 || Kitt Peak || Spacewatch || — || align=right data-sort-value="0.81" | 810 m || 
|-id=472 bgcolor=#E9E9E9
| 410472 ||  || — || February 7, 2008 || Socorro || LINEAR || — || align=right | 1.7 km || 
|-id=473 bgcolor=#E9E9E9
| 410473 ||  || — || February 7, 2008 || Mount Lemmon || Mount Lemmon Survey || — || align=right | 1.2 km || 
|-id=474 bgcolor=#E9E9E9
| 410474 ||  || — || February 12, 2008 || Kitt Peak || Spacewatch || — || align=right data-sort-value="0.80" | 800 m || 
|-id=475 bgcolor=#E9E9E9
| 410475 Robertschulz || 2008 DN ||  || February 24, 2008 || Gaisberg || R. Gierlinger || — || align=right | 1.2 km || 
|-id=476 bgcolor=#fefefe
| 410476 ||  || — || February 7, 2008 || Socorro || LINEAR || H || align=right data-sort-value="0.82" | 820 m || 
|-id=477 bgcolor=#fefefe
| 410477 ||  || — || December 30, 2007 || Mount Lemmon || Mount Lemmon Survey || — || align=right data-sort-value="0.74" | 740 m || 
|-id=478 bgcolor=#E9E9E9
| 410478 ||  || — || February 26, 2008 || Kitt Peak || Spacewatch || MAR || align=right data-sort-value="0.81" | 810 m || 
|-id=479 bgcolor=#fefefe
| 410479 ||  || — || February 26, 2008 || Mount Lemmon || Mount Lemmon Survey || — || align=right data-sort-value="0.73" | 730 m || 
|-id=480 bgcolor=#E9E9E9
| 410480 ||  || — || February 24, 2008 || Kitt Peak || Spacewatch || — || align=right data-sort-value="0.81" | 810 m || 
|-id=481 bgcolor=#E9E9E9
| 410481 ||  || — || January 19, 2008 || Mount Lemmon || Mount Lemmon Survey || — || align=right | 2.8 km || 
|-id=482 bgcolor=#FA8072
| 410482 ||  || — || February 29, 2008 || Kitt Peak || Spacewatch || H || align=right data-sort-value="0.66" | 660 m || 
|-id=483 bgcolor=#E9E9E9
| 410483 ||  || — || February 24, 2008 || Mount Lemmon || Mount Lemmon Survey || — || align=right | 1.1 km || 
|-id=484 bgcolor=#fefefe
| 410484 ||  || — || February 8, 2008 || Mount Lemmon || Mount Lemmon Survey || — || align=right data-sort-value="0.75" | 750 m || 
|-id=485 bgcolor=#fefefe
| 410485 ||  || — || February 27, 2008 || Kitt Peak || Spacewatch || — || align=right | 2.4 km || 
|-id=486 bgcolor=#fefefe
| 410486 ||  || — || February 27, 2008 || Kitt Peak || Spacewatch || H || align=right data-sort-value="0.69" | 690 m || 
|-id=487 bgcolor=#E9E9E9
| 410487 ||  || — || February 27, 2008 || Kitt Peak || Spacewatch || — || align=right | 1.6 km || 
|-id=488 bgcolor=#E9E9E9
| 410488 ||  || — || January 30, 2008 || Kitt Peak || Spacewatch || — || align=right data-sort-value="0.94" | 940 m || 
|-id=489 bgcolor=#E9E9E9
| 410489 ||  || — || February 27, 2008 || Catalina || CSS || — || align=right | 1.9 km || 
|-id=490 bgcolor=#E9E9E9
| 410490 ||  || — || February 27, 2008 || Kitt Peak || Spacewatch || — || align=right | 1.9 km || 
|-id=491 bgcolor=#fefefe
| 410491 ||  || — || February 28, 2008 || Mount Lemmon || Mount Lemmon Survey || — || align=right data-sort-value="0.69" | 690 m || 
|-id=492 bgcolor=#E9E9E9
| 410492 ||  || — || February 29, 2008 || Kitt Peak || Spacewatch || — || align=right | 1.6 km || 
|-id=493 bgcolor=#E9E9E9
| 410493 ||  || — || February 29, 2008 || Kitt Peak || Spacewatch || HNS || align=right | 1.1 km || 
|-id=494 bgcolor=#E9E9E9
| 410494 ||  || — || February 28, 2008 || Kitt Peak || Spacewatch || — || align=right data-sort-value="0.96" | 960 m || 
|-id=495 bgcolor=#E9E9E9
| 410495 ||  || — || February 28, 2008 || Kitt Peak || Spacewatch || — || align=right | 1.2 km || 
|-id=496 bgcolor=#E9E9E9
| 410496 ||  || — || March 1, 2008 || Kitt Peak || Spacewatch || — || align=right | 2.0 km || 
|-id=497 bgcolor=#E9E9E9
| 410497 ||  || — || March 1, 2008 || Kitt Peak || Spacewatch || — || align=right | 1.5 km || 
|-id=498 bgcolor=#E9E9E9
| 410498 ||  || — || March 2, 2008 || Kitt Peak || Spacewatch || — || align=right | 2.4 km || 
|-id=499 bgcolor=#E9E9E9
| 410499 ||  || — || March 5, 2008 || Kitt Peak || Spacewatch || — || align=right | 1.4 km || 
|-id=500 bgcolor=#E9E9E9
| 410500 ||  || — || March 3, 2008 || Kitt Peak || Spacewatch || — || align=right data-sort-value="0.89" | 890 m || 
|}

410501–410600 

|-bgcolor=#E9E9E9
| 410501 ||  || — || March 4, 2008 || Mount Lemmon || Mount Lemmon Survey || — || align=right | 1.5 km || 
|-id=502 bgcolor=#fefefe
| 410502 ||  || — || March 5, 2008 || Catalina || CSS || H || align=right data-sort-value="0.78" | 780 m || 
|-id=503 bgcolor=#E9E9E9
| 410503 ||  || — || March 6, 2008 || Kitt Peak || Spacewatch || EUN || align=right | 1.2 km || 
|-id=504 bgcolor=#E9E9E9
| 410504 ||  || — || March 7, 2008 || Kitt Peak || Spacewatch || — || align=right | 2.0 km || 
|-id=505 bgcolor=#E9E9E9
| 410505 ||  || — || March 3, 2008 || XuYi || PMO NEO || ADE || align=right | 2.3 km || 
|-id=506 bgcolor=#E9E9E9
| 410506 ||  || — || February 9, 2008 || Catalina || CSS || — || align=right | 1.9 km || 
|-id=507 bgcolor=#fefefe
| 410507 ||  || — || March 11, 2008 || Catalina || CSS || H || align=right data-sort-value="0.67" | 670 m || 
|-id=508 bgcolor=#E9E9E9
| 410508 ||  || — || March 4, 2008 || Catalina || CSS || EUN || align=right | 1.9 km || 
|-id=509 bgcolor=#E9E9E9
| 410509 ||  || — || March 8, 2008 || Kitt Peak || Spacewatch || (5) || align=right data-sort-value="0.81" | 810 m || 
|-id=510 bgcolor=#E9E9E9
| 410510 ||  || — || February 29, 2008 || Kitt Peak || Spacewatch || HNS || align=right | 1.3 km || 
|-id=511 bgcolor=#E9E9E9
| 410511 ||  || — || February 9, 2008 || Mount Lemmon || Mount Lemmon Survey || — || align=right | 1.4 km || 
|-id=512 bgcolor=#E9E9E9
| 410512 ||  || — || February 10, 2008 || Mount Lemmon || Mount Lemmon Survey || — || align=right | 1.5 km || 
|-id=513 bgcolor=#E9E9E9
| 410513 ||  || — || March 10, 2008 || Kitt Peak || Spacewatch || — || align=right data-sort-value="0.90" | 900 m || 
|-id=514 bgcolor=#E9E9E9
| 410514 ||  || — || March 11, 2008 || Kitt Peak || Spacewatch || EUN || align=right | 1.7 km || 
|-id=515 bgcolor=#E9E9E9
| 410515 ||  || — || March 11, 2008 || Kitt Peak || Spacewatch || — || align=right | 2.0 km || 
|-id=516 bgcolor=#E9E9E9
| 410516 ||  || — || March 13, 2008 || Mount Lemmon || Mount Lemmon Survey || — || align=right | 1.6 km || 
|-id=517 bgcolor=#E9E9E9
| 410517 ||  || — || March 2, 2008 || Kitt Peak || Spacewatch || — || align=right | 1.7 km || 
|-id=518 bgcolor=#E9E9E9
| 410518 ||  || — || March 10, 2008 || Mount Lemmon || Mount Lemmon Survey || — || align=right | 2.0 km || 
|-id=519 bgcolor=#E9E9E9
| 410519 ||  || — || March 11, 2008 || Mount Lemmon || Mount Lemmon Survey || — || align=right | 1.6 km || 
|-id=520 bgcolor=#d6d6d6
| 410520 ||  || — || March 1, 2008 || Kitt Peak || Spacewatch || — || align=right | 3.1 km || 
|-id=521 bgcolor=#E9E9E9
| 410521 ||  || — || March 10, 2008 || Kitt Peak || Spacewatch || — || align=right | 1.8 km || 
|-id=522 bgcolor=#E9E9E9
| 410522 ||  || — || March 13, 2008 || Kitt Peak || Spacewatch || — || align=right | 1.8 km || 
|-id=523 bgcolor=#E9E9E9
| 410523 ||  || — || March 4, 2008 || Kitt Peak || Spacewatch || — || align=right | 2.0 km || 
|-id=524 bgcolor=#E9E9E9
| 410524 ||  || — || March 5, 2008 || Kitt Peak || Spacewatch || HNS || align=right | 1.3 km || 
|-id=525 bgcolor=#E9E9E9
| 410525 ||  || — || March 12, 2008 || Mount Lemmon || Mount Lemmon Survey || — || align=right | 1.8 km || 
|-id=526 bgcolor=#E9E9E9
| 410526 ||  || — || March 13, 2008 || Socorro || LINEAR || — || align=right | 2.4 km || 
|-id=527 bgcolor=#fefefe
| 410527 ||  || — || March 25, 2008 || Kitt Peak || Spacewatch || H || align=right data-sort-value="0.62" | 620 m || 
|-id=528 bgcolor=#E9E9E9
| 410528 ||  || — || March 3, 2008 || XuYi || PMO NEO || MAR || align=right | 1.3 km || 
|-id=529 bgcolor=#E9E9E9
| 410529 ||  || — || March 25, 2008 || Kitt Peak || Spacewatch || — || align=right | 1.4 km || 
|-id=530 bgcolor=#fefefe
| 410530 ||  || — || March 29, 2008 || Catalina || CSS || H || align=right data-sort-value="0.78" | 780 m || 
|-id=531 bgcolor=#E9E9E9
| 410531 ||  || — || March 29, 2008 || Goodricke-Pigott || R. A. Tucker || — || align=right | 1.8 km || 
|-id=532 bgcolor=#E9E9E9
| 410532 ||  || — || March 26, 2008 || Kitt Peak || Spacewatch || — || align=right | 1.3 km || 
|-id=533 bgcolor=#E9E9E9
| 410533 ||  || — || March 28, 2008 || Kitt Peak || Spacewatch || — || align=right | 1.9 km || 
|-id=534 bgcolor=#fefefe
| 410534 ||  || — || March 28, 2008 || Kitt Peak || Spacewatch || H || align=right data-sort-value="0.77" | 770 m || 
|-id=535 bgcolor=#E9E9E9
| 410535 ||  || — || March 10, 2008 || Kitt Peak || Spacewatch || — || align=right | 2.2 km || 
|-id=536 bgcolor=#E9E9E9
| 410536 ||  || — || March 12, 2008 || Kitt Peak || Spacewatch || — || align=right | 1.8 km || 
|-id=537 bgcolor=#E9E9E9
| 410537 ||  || — || February 13, 2008 || Kitt Peak || Spacewatch || DOR || align=right | 2.4 km || 
|-id=538 bgcolor=#d6d6d6
| 410538 ||  || — || March 28, 2008 || Mount Lemmon || Mount Lemmon Survey || KOR || align=right | 1.1 km || 
|-id=539 bgcolor=#E9E9E9
| 410539 ||  || — || March 29, 2008 || Mount Lemmon || Mount Lemmon Survey || MAR || align=right | 1.1 km || 
|-id=540 bgcolor=#E9E9E9
| 410540 ||  || — || March 29, 2008 || Catalina || CSS || — || align=right | 2.5 km || 
|-id=541 bgcolor=#d6d6d6
| 410541 ||  || — || March 28, 2008 || Kitt Peak || Spacewatch || — || align=right | 2.5 km || 
|-id=542 bgcolor=#E9E9E9
| 410542 ||  || — || March 5, 2008 || Mount Lemmon || Mount Lemmon Survey || — || align=right | 1.8 km || 
|-id=543 bgcolor=#E9E9E9
| 410543 ||  || — || March 31, 2008 || Mount Lemmon || Mount Lemmon Survey || NEM || align=right | 2.2 km || 
|-id=544 bgcolor=#E9E9E9
| 410544 ||  || — || March 10, 2008 || Kitt Peak || Spacewatch || — || align=right | 1.2 km || 
|-id=545 bgcolor=#E9E9E9
| 410545 ||  || — || March 13, 2008 || Kitt Peak || Spacewatch || — || align=right | 1.7 km || 
|-id=546 bgcolor=#E9E9E9
| 410546 ||  || — || March 30, 2008 || Kitt Peak || Spacewatch || — || align=right | 1.1 km || 
|-id=547 bgcolor=#E9E9E9
| 410547 ||  || — || March 30, 2008 || Kitt Peak || Spacewatch || — || align=right | 1.4 km || 
|-id=548 bgcolor=#E9E9E9
| 410548 ||  || — || March 31, 2008 || Mount Lemmon || Mount Lemmon Survey || — || align=right | 1.3 km || 
|-id=549 bgcolor=#fefefe
| 410549 ||  || — || March 30, 2008 || Catalina || CSS || H || align=right data-sort-value="0.98" | 980 m || 
|-id=550 bgcolor=#E9E9E9
| 410550 ||  || — || March 28, 2008 || Kitt Peak || Spacewatch || — || align=right | 2.3 km || 
|-id=551 bgcolor=#E9E9E9
| 410551 ||  || — || March 31, 2008 || Kitt Peak || Spacewatch || — || align=right | 1.4 km || 
|-id=552 bgcolor=#E9E9E9
| 410552 ||  || — || April 1, 2008 || Kitt Peak || Spacewatch || — || align=right | 2.1 km || 
|-id=553 bgcolor=#E9E9E9
| 410553 ||  || — || April 1, 2008 || Kitt Peak || Spacewatch || — || align=right | 2.5 km || 
|-id=554 bgcolor=#E9E9E9
| 410554 ||  || — || April 1, 2008 || Kitt Peak || Spacewatch || — || align=right | 1.9 km || 
|-id=555 bgcolor=#E9E9E9
| 410555 ||  || — || April 4, 2008 || Kitt Peak || Spacewatch || — || align=right | 2.4 km || 
|-id=556 bgcolor=#d6d6d6
| 410556 ||  || — || April 4, 2008 || Kitt Peak || Spacewatch || — || align=right | 2.1 km || 
|-id=557 bgcolor=#E9E9E9
| 410557 ||  || — || April 1, 2008 || Mount Lemmon || Mount Lemmon Survey || — || align=right | 1.9 km || 
|-id=558 bgcolor=#E9E9E9
| 410558 ||  || — || April 3, 2008 || Kitt Peak || Spacewatch || EUN || align=right | 1.1 km || 
|-id=559 bgcolor=#E9E9E9
| 410559 ||  || — || March 30, 2008 || Kitt Peak || Spacewatch || — || align=right | 1.6 km || 
|-id=560 bgcolor=#d6d6d6
| 410560 ||  || — || March 27, 2008 || Mount Lemmon || Mount Lemmon Survey || — || align=right | 2.0 km || 
|-id=561 bgcolor=#E9E9E9
| 410561 ||  || — || April 3, 2008 || Kitt Peak || Spacewatch || WIT || align=right data-sort-value="0.91" | 910 m || 
|-id=562 bgcolor=#d6d6d6
| 410562 ||  || — || April 3, 2008 || Mount Lemmon || Mount Lemmon Survey || EOS || align=right | 1.8 km || 
|-id=563 bgcolor=#E9E9E9
| 410563 ||  || — || March 29, 2008 || Kitt Peak || Spacewatch || GEF || align=right | 1.1 km || 
|-id=564 bgcolor=#E9E9E9
| 410564 ||  || — || April 4, 2008 || Kitt Peak || Spacewatch || — || align=right | 1.5 km || 
|-id=565 bgcolor=#E9E9E9
| 410565 ||  || — || March 29, 2008 || Kitt Peak || Spacewatch || — || align=right | 2.3 km || 
|-id=566 bgcolor=#E9E9E9
| 410566 ||  || — || April 4, 2008 || Mount Lemmon || Mount Lemmon Survey || — || align=right | 2.8 km || 
|-id=567 bgcolor=#E9E9E9
| 410567 ||  || — || April 5, 2008 || Kitt Peak || Spacewatch || — || align=right | 1.5 km || 
|-id=568 bgcolor=#E9E9E9
| 410568 ||  || — || March 10, 2008 || Mount Lemmon || Mount Lemmon Survey || MRX || align=right | 1.1 km || 
|-id=569 bgcolor=#E9E9E9
| 410569 ||  || — || March 29, 2008 || Kitt Peak || Spacewatch || MRX || align=right | 1.0 km || 
|-id=570 bgcolor=#E9E9E9
| 410570 ||  || — || April 6, 2008 || Kitt Peak || Spacewatch || — || align=right | 2.1 km || 
|-id=571 bgcolor=#E9E9E9
| 410571 ||  || — || April 7, 2008 || Kitt Peak || Spacewatch || (5) || align=right data-sort-value="0.88" | 880 m || 
|-id=572 bgcolor=#E9E9E9
| 410572 ||  || — || April 7, 2008 || Kitt Peak || Spacewatch || — || align=right | 1.9 km || 
|-id=573 bgcolor=#E9E9E9
| 410573 ||  || — || January 19, 2008 || Mount Lemmon || Mount Lemmon Survey || — || align=right | 2.8 km || 
|-id=574 bgcolor=#E9E9E9
| 410574 ||  || — || October 25, 2005 || Mount Lemmon || Mount Lemmon Survey || — || align=right | 2.2 km || 
|-id=575 bgcolor=#E9E9E9
| 410575 ||  || — || March 4, 2008 || Mount Lemmon || Mount Lemmon Survey || — || align=right | 1.9 km || 
|-id=576 bgcolor=#E9E9E9
| 410576 ||  || — || March 29, 2008 || Mount Lemmon || Mount Lemmon Survey || EUN || align=right | 1.1 km || 
|-id=577 bgcolor=#E9E9E9
| 410577 ||  || — || April 9, 2008 || Kitt Peak || Spacewatch || — || align=right | 2.2 km || 
|-id=578 bgcolor=#E9E9E9
| 410578 ||  || — || April 10, 2008 || Kitt Peak || Spacewatch || — || align=right | 2.5 km || 
|-id=579 bgcolor=#E9E9E9
| 410579 ||  || — || March 28, 2008 || Kitt Peak || Spacewatch || — || align=right data-sort-value="0.95" | 950 m || 
|-id=580 bgcolor=#E9E9E9
| 410580 ||  || — || April 11, 2008 || Kitt Peak || Spacewatch || — || align=right | 1.7 km || 
|-id=581 bgcolor=#FA8072
| 410581 ||  || — || March 10, 2008 || Kitt Peak || Spacewatch || H || align=right data-sort-value="0.50" | 500 m || 
|-id=582 bgcolor=#fefefe
| 410582 ||  || — || April 9, 2008 || Kitt Peak || Spacewatch || H || align=right data-sort-value="0.60" | 600 m || 
|-id=583 bgcolor=#E9E9E9
| 410583 ||  || — || March 10, 2008 || Mount Lemmon || Mount Lemmon Survey || MAR || align=right | 1.0 km || 
|-id=584 bgcolor=#E9E9E9
| 410584 ||  || — || April 13, 2008 || Kitt Peak || Spacewatch || — || align=right | 1.5 km || 
|-id=585 bgcolor=#E9E9E9
| 410585 ||  || — || February 2, 2008 || Mount Lemmon || Mount Lemmon Survey || — || align=right | 1.7 km || 
|-id=586 bgcolor=#E9E9E9
| 410586 ||  || — || March 30, 2008 || Catalina || CSS || — || align=right | 2.4 km || 
|-id=587 bgcolor=#E9E9E9
| 410587 ||  || — || April 4, 2008 || Kitt Peak || Spacewatch || — || align=right | 2.3 km || 
|-id=588 bgcolor=#d6d6d6
| 410588 ||  || — || April 14, 2008 || Kitt Peak || Spacewatch || — || align=right | 2.3 km || 
|-id=589 bgcolor=#E9E9E9
| 410589 ||  || — || April 8, 2008 || Kitt Peak || Spacewatch || WIT || align=right | 1.00 km || 
|-id=590 bgcolor=#d6d6d6
| 410590 ||  || — || April 6, 2008 || Kitt Peak || Spacewatch || — || align=right | 2.6 km || 
|-id=591 bgcolor=#fefefe
| 410591 ||  || — || April 5, 2008 || Catalina || CSS || H || align=right data-sort-value="0.86" | 860 m || 
|-id=592 bgcolor=#E9E9E9
| 410592 ||  || — || April 11, 2008 || Socorro || LINEAR || GAL || align=right | 2.2 km || 
|-id=593 bgcolor=#d6d6d6
| 410593 ||  || — || April 15, 2008 || Mount Lemmon || Mount Lemmon Survey || — || align=right | 2.7 km || 
|-id=594 bgcolor=#E9E9E9
| 410594 ||  || — || March 2, 2008 || Mount Lemmon || Mount Lemmon Survey || — || align=right | 2.7 km || 
|-id=595 bgcolor=#E9E9E9
| 410595 ||  || — || March 4, 2008 || Mount Lemmon || Mount Lemmon Survey || — || align=right | 1.8 km || 
|-id=596 bgcolor=#E9E9E9
| 410596 ||  || — || April 27, 2008 || Mount Lemmon || Mount Lemmon Survey || WIT || align=right data-sort-value="0.86" | 860 m || 
|-id=597 bgcolor=#d6d6d6
| 410597 ||  || — || April 4, 2008 || Kitt Peak || Spacewatch || — || align=right | 2.7 km || 
|-id=598 bgcolor=#d6d6d6
| 410598 ||  || — || April 27, 2008 || Kitt Peak || Spacewatch || — || align=right | 2.2 km || 
|-id=599 bgcolor=#d6d6d6
| 410599 ||  || — || March 29, 2008 || Kitt Peak || Spacewatch || — || align=right | 2.4 km || 
|-id=600 bgcolor=#fefefe
| 410600 ||  || — || April 28, 2008 || Kitt Peak || Spacewatch || H || align=right data-sort-value="0.69" | 690 m || 
|}

410601–410700 

|-bgcolor=#E9E9E9
| 410601 ||  || — || April 29, 2008 || Kitt Peak || Spacewatch || AGN || align=right | 1.2 km || 
|-id=602 bgcolor=#E9E9E9
| 410602 ||  || — || April 30, 2008 || Kitt Peak || Spacewatch || — || align=right | 2.0 km || 
|-id=603 bgcolor=#d6d6d6
| 410603 ||  || — || April 28, 2008 || Kitt Peak || Spacewatch || — || align=right | 2.4 km || 
|-id=604 bgcolor=#E9E9E9
| 410604 ||  || — || May 4, 2008 || Kitt Peak || Spacewatch || — || align=right | 1.8 km || 
|-id=605 bgcolor=#E9E9E9
| 410605 ||  || — || May 8, 2008 || Mount Lemmon || Mount Lemmon Survey || HNS || align=right | 1.5 km || 
|-id=606 bgcolor=#E9E9E9
| 410606 ||  || — || March 29, 2008 || Kitt Peak || Spacewatch || EUN || align=right | 1.1 km || 
|-id=607 bgcolor=#E9E9E9
| 410607 ||  || — || May 1, 2008 || Kitt Peak || Spacewatch || — || align=right | 2.0 km || 
|-id=608 bgcolor=#E9E9E9
| 410608 ||  || — || May 14, 2008 || Mount Lemmon || Mount Lemmon Survey || — || align=right | 1.9 km || 
|-id=609 bgcolor=#E9E9E9
| 410609 ||  || — || June 1, 2008 || Kitt Peak || Spacewatch || — || align=right | 2.3 km || 
|-id=610 bgcolor=#E9E9E9
| 410610 ||  || — || June 7, 2008 || Kitt Peak || Spacewatch || — || align=right | 1.9 km || 
|-id=611 bgcolor=#d6d6d6
| 410611 ||  || — || June 24, 2008 || Siding Spring || SSS || — || align=right | 5.0 km || 
|-id=612 bgcolor=#d6d6d6
| 410612 ||  || — || June 29, 2008 || Bergisch Gladbac || W. Bickel || — || align=right | 2.7 km || 
|-id=613 bgcolor=#E9E9E9
| 410613 ||  || — || July 1, 2008 || Antares || ARO || — || align=right | 3.5 km || 
|-id=614 bgcolor=#d6d6d6
| 410614 ||  || — || July 31, 2008 || La Sagra || OAM Obs. || — || align=right | 2.4 km || 
|-id=615 bgcolor=#d6d6d6
| 410615 ||  || — || July 29, 2008 || La Sagra || OAM Obs. || — || align=right | 3.1 km || 
|-id=616 bgcolor=#d6d6d6
| 410616 ||  || — || July 30, 2008 || Mount Lemmon || Mount Lemmon Survey || — || align=right | 2.5 km || 
|-id=617 bgcolor=#d6d6d6
| 410617 ||  || — || August 4, 2008 || Skylive Obs. || F. Tozzi || — || align=right | 4.6 km || 
|-id=618 bgcolor=#d6d6d6
| 410618 ||  || — || August 1, 2008 || La Sagra || OAM Obs. || — || align=right | 3.8 km || 
|-id=619 bgcolor=#d6d6d6
| 410619 Fabry ||  ||  || August 2, 2008 || Eygalayes Obs. || P. Sogorb || TIR || align=right | 3.3 km || 
|-id=620 bgcolor=#d6d6d6
| 410620 ||  || — || August 7, 2008 || Reedy Creek || J. Broughton || — || align=right | 3.6 km || 
|-id=621 bgcolor=#d6d6d6
| 410621 ||  || — || August 2, 2008 || La Sagra || OAM Obs. || — || align=right | 3.5 km || 
|-id=622 bgcolor=#FFC2E0
| 410622 ||  || — || August 21, 2008 || Kitt Peak || Spacewatch || AMO || align=right data-sort-value="0.16" | 160 m || 
|-id=623 bgcolor=#d6d6d6
| 410623 ||  || — || August 21, 2008 || Kitt Peak || Spacewatch || TIR || align=right | 2.6 km || 
|-id=624 bgcolor=#d6d6d6
| 410624 ||  || — || August 29, 2008 || La Sagra || OAM Obs. || — || align=right | 3.5 km || 
|-id=625 bgcolor=#d6d6d6
| 410625 ||  || — || August 20, 2008 || Kitt Peak || Spacewatch || — || align=right | 2.5 km || 
|-id=626 bgcolor=#d6d6d6
| 410626 ||  || — || August 23, 2008 || Kitt Peak || Spacewatch || — || align=right | 3.0 km || 
|-id=627 bgcolor=#FFC2E0
| 410627 ||  || — || September 4, 2008 || Socorro || LINEAR || APOPHA || align=right data-sort-value="0.26" | 260 m || 
|-id=628 bgcolor=#d6d6d6
| 410628 ||  || — || September 2, 2008 || Kitt Peak || Spacewatch || — || align=right | 3.8 km || 
|-id=629 bgcolor=#d6d6d6
| 410629 ||  || — || September 3, 2008 || Kitt Peak || Spacewatch || HYG || align=right | 3.1 km || 
|-id=630 bgcolor=#d6d6d6
| 410630 ||  || — || September 4, 2008 || Kitt Peak || Spacewatch || — || align=right | 4.1 km || 
|-id=631 bgcolor=#d6d6d6
| 410631 ||  || — || August 24, 2008 || Kitt Peak || Spacewatch || — || align=right | 2.5 km || 
|-id=632 bgcolor=#d6d6d6
| 410632 ||  || — || September 2, 2008 || Kitt Peak || Spacewatch || THM || align=right | 2.2 km || 
|-id=633 bgcolor=#E9E9E9
| 410633 ||  || — || September 2, 2008 || Kitt Peak || Spacewatch || HOF || align=right | 4.0 km || 
|-id=634 bgcolor=#d6d6d6
| 410634 ||  || — || September 2, 2008 || Kitt Peak || Spacewatch || — || align=right | 2.3 km || 
|-id=635 bgcolor=#d6d6d6
| 410635 ||  || — || September 2, 2008 || Kitt Peak || Spacewatch || TIR || align=right | 3.1 km || 
|-id=636 bgcolor=#d6d6d6
| 410636 ||  || — || September 3, 2008 || Kitt Peak || Spacewatch || — || align=right | 3.1 km || 
|-id=637 bgcolor=#d6d6d6
| 410637 ||  || — || September 4, 2008 || Kitt Peak || Spacewatch || THB || align=right | 3.9 km || 
|-id=638 bgcolor=#d6d6d6
| 410638 ||  || — || September 6, 2008 || Mount Lemmon || Mount Lemmon Survey || VER || align=right | 2.3 km || 
|-id=639 bgcolor=#d6d6d6
| 410639 ||  || — || September 6, 2008 || Mount Lemmon || Mount Lemmon Survey || URS || align=right | 3.3 km || 
|-id=640 bgcolor=#d6d6d6
| 410640 ||  || — || September 5, 2008 || Kitt Peak || Spacewatch || 7:4 || align=right | 3.9 km || 
|-id=641 bgcolor=#d6d6d6
| 410641 ||  || — || September 6, 2008 || Kitt Peak || Spacewatch || URS || align=right | 2.9 km || 
|-id=642 bgcolor=#d6d6d6
| 410642 ||  || — || September 7, 2008 || Catalina || CSS || — || align=right | 2.9 km || 
|-id=643 bgcolor=#d6d6d6
| 410643 ||  || — || September 4, 2008 || Kitt Peak || Spacewatch || VER || align=right | 2.9 km || 
|-id=644 bgcolor=#d6d6d6
| 410644 ||  || — || September 4, 2008 || Kitt Peak || Spacewatch || EOS || align=right | 1.8 km || 
|-id=645 bgcolor=#d6d6d6
| 410645 ||  || — || September 7, 2008 || Mount Lemmon || Mount Lemmon Survey || — || align=right | 3.8 km || 
|-id=646 bgcolor=#d6d6d6
| 410646 ||  || — || September 5, 2008 || Kitt Peak || Spacewatch || HYG || align=right | 3.4 km || 
|-id=647 bgcolor=#d6d6d6
| 410647 ||  || — || September 6, 2008 || Catalina || CSS || — || align=right | 4.0 km || 
|-id=648 bgcolor=#d6d6d6
| 410648 ||  || — || September 5, 2008 || Kitt Peak || Spacewatch || — || align=right | 3.0 km || 
|-id=649 bgcolor=#FFC2E0
| 410649 ||  || — || September 21, 2008 || Kitt Peak || Spacewatch || AMOcritical || align=right data-sort-value="0.25" | 250 m || 
|-id=650 bgcolor=#FFC2E0
| 410650 ||  || — || September 23, 2008 || Catalina || CSS || AMO || align=right data-sort-value="0.71" | 710 m || 
|-id=651 bgcolor=#d6d6d6
| 410651 ||  || — || September 22, 2003 || Kitt Peak || Spacewatch || — || align=right | 2.7 km || 
|-id=652 bgcolor=#d6d6d6
| 410652 ||  || — || September 19, 2008 || Kitt Peak || Spacewatch || — || align=right | 3.3 km || 
|-id=653 bgcolor=#d6d6d6
| 410653 ||  || — || September 20, 2008 || Catalina || CSS || — || align=right | 3.0 km || 
|-id=654 bgcolor=#d6d6d6
| 410654 ||  || — || September 20, 2008 || Kitt Peak || Spacewatch || — || align=right | 4.4 km || 
|-id=655 bgcolor=#d6d6d6
| 410655 ||  || — || September 20, 2008 || Kitt Peak || Spacewatch || LUT || align=right | 5.3 km || 
|-id=656 bgcolor=#d6d6d6
| 410656 ||  || — || September 21, 2008 || Catalina || CSS || 7:4 || align=right | 5.2 km || 
|-id=657 bgcolor=#d6d6d6
| 410657 ||  || — || September 27, 2008 || Modra || Modra Obs. || HYG || align=right | 3.1 km || 
|-id=658 bgcolor=#d6d6d6
| 410658 ||  || — || September 23, 2008 || Mount Lemmon || Mount Lemmon Survey || — || align=right | 3.7 km || 
|-id=659 bgcolor=#d6d6d6
| 410659 ||  || — || September 28, 2008 || Bastia || Bastia Obs. || — || align=right | 2.7 km || 
|-id=660 bgcolor=#d6d6d6
| 410660 ||  || — || September 30, 2008 || Mount Lemmon || Mount Lemmon Survey || Tj (2.94) || align=right | 3.5 km || 
|-id=661 bgcolor=#d6d6d6
| 410661 ||  || — || September 28, 2008 || Catalina || CSS || Tj (2.92) || align=right | 3.8 km || 
|-id=662 bgcolor=#d6d6d6
| 410662 ||  || — || September 29, 2008 || Hibiscus || N. Teamo || — || align=right | 2.9 km || 
|-id=663 bgcolor=#d6d6d6
| 410663 ||  || — || September 24, 2008 || Socorro || LINEAR || — || align=right | 3.2 km || 
|-id=664 bgcolor=#d6d6d6
| 410664 ||  || — || September 24, 2008 || Socorro || LINEAR || — || align=right | 3.2 km || 
|-id=665 bgcolor=#d6d6d6
| 410665 ||  || — || September 19, 2008 || Kitt Peak || Spacewatch || — || align=right | 4.5 km || 
|-id=666 bgcolor=#fefefe
| 410666 ||  || — || September 22, 2008 || Catalina || CSS || H || align=right data-sort-value="0.87" | 870 m || 
|-id=667 bgcolor=#d6d6d6
| 410667 ||  || — || September 25, 2008 || Kitt Peak || Spacewatch || — || align=right | 3.8 km || 
|-id=668 bgcolor=#d6d6d6
| 410668 ||  || — || September 26, 2008 || Kitt Peak || Spacewatch || 7:4 || align=right | 3.2 km || 
|-id=669 bgcolor=#d6d6d6
| 410669 ||  || — || September 30, 2008 || La Sagra || OAM Obs. || — || align=right | 3.0 km || 
|-id=670 bgcolor=#d6d6d6
| 410670 ||  || — || September 22, 2008 || Catalina || CSS || Tj (2.99) || align=right | 3.7 km || 
|-id=671 bgcolor=#d6d6d6
| 410671 ||  || — || September 23, 2008 || Mount Lemmon || Mount Lemmon Survey || — || align=right | 3.1 km || 
|-id=672 bgcolor=#d6d6d6
| 410672 ||  || — || October 6, 2008 || Kitt Peak || Spacewatch || — || align=right | 3.6 km || 
|-id=673 bgcolor=#d6d6d6
| 410673 ||  || — || October 20, 2008 || Kitt Peak || Spacewatch || — || align=right | 3.4 km || 
|-id=674 bgcolor=#d6d6d6
| 410674 ||  || — || October 10, 2008 || Mount Lemmon || Mount Lemmon Survey || 7:4 || align=right | 3.3 km || 
|-id=675 bgcolor=#d6d6d6
| 410675 ||  || — || October 21, 2008 || Kitt Peak || Spacewatch || SYL7:4 || align=right | 6.3 km || 
|-id=676 bgcolor=#fefefe
| 410676 ||  || — || October 21, 2008 || Kitt Peak || Spacewatch || — || align=right data-sort-value="0.57" | 570 m || 
|-id=677 bgcolor=#d6d6d6
| 410677 ||  || — || October 24, 2008 || Kitt Peak || Spacewatch || — || align=right | 4.9 km || 
|-id=678 bgcolor=#d6d6d6
| 410678 ||  || — || October 24, 2008 || Siding Spring || SSS || — || align=right | 7.1 km || 
|-id=679 bgcolor=#fefefe
| 410679 ||  || — || October 28, 2008 || Mount Lemmon || Mount Lemmon Survey || — || align=right data-sort-value="0.49" | 490 m || 
|-id=680 bgcolor=#d6d6d6
| 410680 ||  || — || October 24, 2008 || Catalina || CSS || — || align=right | 5.1 km || 
|-id=681 bgcolor=#d6d6d6
| 410681 ||  || — || October 24, 2008 || Socorro || LINEAR || — || align=right | 4.3 km || 
|-id=682 bgcolor=#fefefe
| 410682 ||  || — || November 1, 2008 || Mount Lemmon || Mount Lemmon Survey || — || align=right data-sort-value="0.60" | 600 m || 
|-id=683 bgcolor=#d6d6d6
| 410683 ||  || — || November 6, 2008 || Mount Lemmon || Mount Lemmon Survey || SYL7:4 || align=right | 4.5 km || 
|-id=684 bgcolor=#fefefe
| 410684 ||  || — || November 5, 2008 || Kitt Peak || Spacewatch || — || align=right data-sort-value="0.67" | 670 m || 
|-id=685 bgcolor=#FA8072
| 410685 ||  || — || November 22, 2008 || Sandlot || G. Hug || — || align=right data-sort-value="0.62" | 620 m || 
|-id=686 bgcolor=#fefefe
| 410686 ||  || — || November 20, 2008 || Kitt Peak || Spacewatch || — || align=right data-sort-value="0.47" | 470 m || 
|-id=687 bgcolor=#fefefe
| 410687 ||  || — || November 21, 2008 || Kitt Peak || Spacewatch || — || align=right data-sort-value="0.69" | 690 m || 
|-id=688 bgcolor=#fefefe
| 410688 ||  || — || November 21, 2008 || Kitt Peak || Spacewatch || — || align=right data-sort-value="0.98" | 980 m || 
|-id=689 bgcolor=#fefefe
| 410689 ||  || — || December 1, 2008 || Kitt Peak || Spacewatch || — || align=right data-sort-value="0.85" | 850 m || 
|-id=690 bgcolor=#fefefe
| 410690 ||  || — || October 23, 2008 || Kitt Peak || Spacewatch || — || align=right data-sort-value="0.71" | 710 m || 
|-id=691 bgcolor=#fefefe
| 410691 ||  || — || December 2, 2008 || Kitt Peak || Spacewatch || — || align=right data-sort-value="0.76" | 760 m || 
|-id=692 bgcolor=#E9E9E9
| 410692 ||  || — || December 4, 2008 || Mount Lemmon || Mount Lemmon Survey || — || align=right | 1.4 km || 
|-id=693 bgcolor=#E9E9E9
| 410693 ||  || — || December 7, 2008 || Mount Lemmon || Mount Lemmon Survey || — || align=right | 1.8 km || 
|-id=694 bgcolor=#fefefe
| 410694 ||  || — || December 21, 2008 || Mount Lemmon || Mount Lemmon Survey || — || align=right data-sort-value="0.83" | 830 m || 
|-id=695 bgcolor=#fefefe
| 410695 ||  || — || December 21, 2008 || Mount Lemmon || Mount Lemmon Survey || — || align=right data-sort-value="0.92" | 920 m || 
|-id=696 bgcolor=#fefefe
| 410696 ||  || — || November 24, 2008 || Mount Lemmon || Mount Lemmon Survey || — || align=right data-sort-value="0.83" | 830 m || 
|-id=697 bgcolor=#fefefe
| 410697 ||  || — || November 8, 2008 || Mount Lemmon || Mount Lemmon Survey || V || align=right data-sort-value="0.79" | 790 m || 
|-id=698 bgcolor=#fefefe
| 410698 ||  || — || December 29, 2008 || Kitt Peak || Spacewatch || — || align=right data-sort-value="0.67" | 670 m || 
|-id=699 bgcolor=#fefefe
| 410699 ||  || — || December 30, 2008 || Kitt Peak || Spacewatch || — || align=right data-sort-value="0.62" | 620 m || 
|-id=700 bgcolor=#fefefe
| 410700 ||  || — || December 30, 2008 || Kitt Peak || Spacewatch || — || align=right | 1.0 km || 
|}

410701–410800 

|-bgcolor=#fefefe
| 410701 ||  || — || December 21, 2008 || Kitt Peak || Spacewatch || — || align=right data-sort-value="0.78" | 780 m || 
|-id=702 bgcolor=#fefefe
| 410702 ||  || — || November 20, 2008 || Mount Lemmon || Mount Lemmon Survey || — || align=right data-sort-value="0.62" | 620 m || 
|-id=703 bgcolor=#fefefe
| 410703 ||  || — || January 2, 2009 || Mount Lemmon || Mount Lemmon Survey || — || align=right data-sort-value="0.92" | 920 m || 
|-id=704 bgcolor=#fefefe
| 410704 ||  || — || December 22, 2008 || Mount Lemmon || Mount Lemmon Survey || — || align=right data-sort-value="0.72" | 720 m || 
|-id=705 bgcolor=#fefefe
| 410705 ||  || — || January 15, 2009 || Kitt Peak || Spacewatch || — || align=right data-sort-value="0.81" | 810 m || 
|-id=706 bgcolor=#fefefe
| 410706 ||  || — || January 15, 2009 || Kitt Peak || Spacewatch || — || align=right data-sort-value="0.73" | 730 m || 
|-id=707 bgcolor=#fefefe
| 410707 ||  || — || January 7, 2009 || Kitt Peak || Spacewatch || — || align=right data-sort-value="0.72" | 720 m || 
|-id=708 bgcolor=#fefefe
| 410708 ||  || — || January 3, 2009 || Mount Lemmon || Mount Lemmon Survey || — || align=right data-sort-value="0.64" | 640 m || 
|-id=709 bgcolor=#fefefe
| 410709 ||  || — || January 21, 2009 || Sierra Stars || F. Tozzi || — || align=right | 1.5 km || 
|-id=710 bgcolor=#fefefe
| 410710 ||  || — || January 17, 2009 || Catalina || CSS || — || align=right data-sort-value="0.69" | 690 m || 
|-id=711 bgcolor=#fefefe
| 410711 ||  || — || January 16, 2009 || Kitt Peak || Spacewatch || — || align=right data-sort-value="0.67" | 670 m || 
|-id=712 bgcolor=#fefefe
| 410712 ||  || — || December 30, 2008 || Kitt Peak || Spacewatch || V || align=right data-sort-value="0.69" | 690 m || 
|-id=713 bgcolor=#fefefe
| 410713 ||  || — || January 16, 2009 || Kitt Peak || Spacewatch || NYS || align=right data-sort-value="0.57" | 570 m || 
|-id=714 bgcolor=#fefefe
| 410714 ||  || — || January 16, 2009 || Kitt Peak || Spacewatch || — || align=right data-sort-value="0.76" | 760 m || 
|-id=715 bgcolor=#fefefe
| 410715 ||  || — || January 16, 2009 || Kitt Peak || Spacewatch || — || align=right data-sort-value="0.61" | 610 m || 
|-id=716 bgcolor=#fefefe
| 410716 ||  || — || December 4, 2008 || Mount Lemmon || Mount Lemmon Survey || — || align=right data-sort-value="0.58" | 580 m || 
|-id=717 bgcolor=#fefefe
| 410717 ||  || — || January 20, 2009 || Kitt Peak || Spacewatch || — || align=right data-sort-value="0.95" | 950 m || 
|-id=718 bgcolor=#fefefe
| 410718 ||  || — || January 20, 2009 || Kitt Peak || Spacewatch || V || align=right data-sort-value="0.68" | 680 m || 
|-id=719 bgcolor=#fefefe
| 410719 ||  || — || January 20, 2009 || Kitt Peak || Spacewatch || NYS || align=right data-sort-value="0.61" | 610 m || 
|-id=720 bgcolor=#E9E9E9
| 410720 ||  || — || November 21, 2008 || Mount Lemmon || Mount Lemmon Survey || — || align=right | 1.8 km || 
|-id=721 bgcolor=#fefefe
| 410721 ||  || — || December 31, 2008 || Kitt Peak || Spacewatch || — || align=right | 1.0 km || 
|-id=722 bgcolor=#fefefe
| 410722 ||  || — || January 31, 2009 || Socorro || LINEAR || — || align=right data-sort-value="0.92" | 920 m || 
|-id=723 bgcolor=#fefefe
| 410723 ||  || — || December 22, 2008 || Mount Lemmon || Mount Lemmon Survey || — || align=right data-sort-value="0.70" | 700 m || 
|-id=724 bgcolor=#fefefe
| 410724 ||  || — || March 25, 2006 || Kitt Peak || Spacewatch || — || align=right data-sort-value="0.68" | 680 m || 
|-id=725 bgcolor=#fefefe
| 410725 ||  || — || January 3, 2009 || Mount Lemmon || Mount Lemmon Survey || — || align=right data-sort-value="0.72" | 720 m || 
|-id=726 bgcolor=#fefefe
| 410726 ||  || — || January 29, 2009 || Mount Lemmon || Mount Lemmon Survey || — || align=right data-sort-value="0.85" | 850 m || 
|-id=727 bgcolor=#fefefe
| 410727 ||  || — || January 20, 2009 || Mount Lemmon || Mount Lemmon Survey || — || align=right data-sort-value="0.63" | 630 m || 
|-id=728 bgcolor=#fefefe
| 410728 ||  || — || January 18, 2009 || Catalina || CSS || — || align=right data-sort-value="0.72" | 720 m || 
|-id=729 bgcolor=#fefefe
| 410729 ||  || — || January 18, 2009 || Socorro || LINEAR || — || align=right | 1.1 km || 
|-id=730 bgcolor=#fefefe
| 410730 ||  || — || January 18, 2009 || Kitt Peak || Spacewatch || — || align=right data-sort-value="0.93" | 930 m || 
|-id=731 bgcolor=#fefefe
| 410731 ||  || — || February 1, 2009 || Kitt Peak || Spacewatch || V || align=right data-sort-value="0.60" | 600 m || 
|-id=732 bgcolor=#fefefe
| 410732 ||  || — || January 19, 2009 || Mount Lemmon || Mount Lemmon Survey || — || align=right data-sort-value="0.65" | 650 m || 
|-id=733 bgcolor=#fefefe
| 410733 ||  || — || February 1, 2009 || Kitt Peak || Spacewatch || — || align=right data-sort-value="0.74" | 740 m || 
|-id=734 bgcolor=#fefefe
| 410734 ||  || — || February 1, 2009 || Kitt Peak || Spacewatch || — || align=right data-sort-value="0.70" | 700 m || 
|-id=735 bgcolor=#fefefe
| 410735 ||  || — || February 1, 2009 || Kitt Peak || Spacewatch || — || align=right data-sort-value="0.62" | 620 m || 
|-id=736 bgcolor=#fefefe
| 410736 ||  || — || February 1, 2009 || Kitt Peak || Spacewatch || — || align=right data-sort-value="0.63" | 630 m || 
|-id=737 bgcolor=#fefefe
| 410737 ||  || — || September 28, 2003 || Kitt Peak || Spacewatch || — || align=right data-sort-value="0.80" | 800 m || 
|-id=738 bgcolor=#fefefe
| 410738 ||  || — || February 13, 2009 || Kitt Peak || Spacewatch || — || align=right data-sort-value="0.86" | 860 m || 
|-id=739 bgcolor=#fefefe
| 410739 ||  || — || February 14, 2009 || Mount Lemmon || Mount Lemmon Survey || — || align=right data-sort-value="0.76" | 760 m || 
|-id=740 bgcolor=#fefefe
| 410740 ||  || — || February 14, 2009 || Mount Lemmon || Mount Lemmon Survey || NYS || align=right data-sort-value="0.48" | 480 m || 
|-id=741 bgcolor=#fefefe
| 410741 ||  || — || January 23, 2009 || XuYi || PMO NEO || — || align=right data-sort-value="0.82" | 820 m || 
|-id=742 bgcolor=#fefefe
| 410742 ||  || — || February 14, 2009 || Mount Lemmon || Mount Lemmon Survey || — || align=right data-sort-value="0.64" | 640 m || 
|-id=743 bgcolor=#d6d6d6
| 410743 ||  || — || February 1, 2009 || Mount Lemmon || Mount Lemmon Survey || — || align=right | 2.4 km || 
|-id=744 bgcolor=#fefefe
| 410744 ||  || — || February 4, 2009 || Mount Lemmon || Mount Lemmon Survey || NYS || align=right data-sort-value="0.76" | 760 m || 
|-id=745 bgcolor=#fefefe
| 410745 ||  || — || February 19, 2009 || Mount Lemmon || Mount Lemmon Survey || — || align=right data-sort-value="0.86" | 860 m || 
|-id=746 bgcolor=#fefefe
| 410746 ||  || — || February 17, 2009 || Kitt Peak || Spacewatch || — || align=right data-sort-value="0.87" | 870 m || 
|-id=747 bgcolor=#fefefe
| 410747 ||  || — || October 13, 2001 || Kitt Peak || Spacewatch || — || align=right data-sort-value="0.55" | 550 m || 
|-id=748 bgcolor=#fefefe
| 410748 ||  || — || February 19, 2009 || Kitt Peak || Spacewatch || V || align=right data-sort-value="0.62" | 620 m || 
|-id=749 bgcolor=#fefefe
| 410749 ||  || — || February 20, 2009 || Socorro || LINEAR || — || align=right | 1.2 km || 
|-id=750 bgcolor=#fefefe
| 410750 ||  || — || February 3, 2009 || Mount Lemmon || Mount Lemmon Survey || — || align=right data-sort-value="0.57" | 570 m || 
|-id=751 bgcolor=#fefefe
| 410751 ||  || — || February 26, 2009 || Calvin-Rehoboth || Calvin–Rehoboth Obs. || — || align=right data-sort-value="0.90" | 900 m || 
|-id=752 bgcolor=#fefefe
| 410752 ||  || — || February 1, 2009 || Kitt Peak || Spacewatch || — || align=right data-sort-value="0.72" | 720 m || 
|-id=753 bgcolor=#fefefe
| 410753 ||  || — || January 20, 2009 || Kitt Peak || Spacewatch || — || align=right data-sort-value="0.60" | 600 m || 
|-id=754 bgcolor=#fefefe
| 410754 ||  || — || February 22, 2009 || Kitt Peak || Spacewatch || — || align=right data-sort-value="0.63" | 630 m || 
|-id=755 bgcolor=#fefefe
| 410755 ||  || — || February 22, 2009 || Kitt Peak || Spacewatch || — || align=right data-sort-value="0.85" | 850 m || 
|-id=756 bgcolor=#fefefe
| 410756 ||  || — || February 22, 2009 || Kitt Peak || Spacewatch || — || align=right data-sort-value="0.93" | 930 m || 
|-id=757 bgcolor=#E9E9E9
| 410757 ||  || — || February 20, 2009 || Kitt Peak || Spacewatch || — || align=right data-sort-value="0.89" | 890 m || 
|-id=758 bgcolor=#fefefe
| 410758 ||  || — || February 22, 2009 || Kitt Peak || Spacewatch || — || align=right data-sort-value="0.74" | 740 m || 
|-id=759 bgcolor=#fefefe
| 410759 ||  || — || December 22, 2008 || Mount Lemmon || Mount Lemmon Survey || — || align=right data-sort-value="0.81" | 810 m || 
|-id=760 bgcolor=#fefefe
| 410760 ||  || — || January 1, 2009 || Mount Lemmon || Mount Lemmon Survey || — || align=right | 1.0 km || 
|-id=761 bgcolor=#E9E9E9
| 410761 ||  || — || February 24, 2009 || Kitt Peak || Spacewatch || — || align=right | 1.6 km || 
|-id=762 bgcolor=#fefefe
| 410762 ||  || — || February 26, 2009 || Kitt Peak || Spacewatch || — || align=right data-sort-value="0.72" | 720 m || 
|-id=763 bgcolor=#fefefe
| 410763 ||  || — || February 27, 2009 || Kitt Peak || Spacewatch || — || align=right data-sort-value="0.75" | 750 m || 
|-id=764 bgcolor=#fefefe
| 410764 ||  || — || February 19, 2009 || Kitt Peak || Spacewatch || — || align=right data-sort-value="0.71" | 710 m || 
|-id=765 bgcolor=#fefefe
| 410765 ||  || — || February 19, 2009 || Kitt Peak || Spacewatch || MAS || align=right data-sort-value="0.94" | 940 m || 
|-id=766 bgcolor=#fefefe
| 410766 ||  || — || February 27, 2009 || Kitt Peak || Spacewatch || — || align=right data-sort-value="0.80" | 800 m || 
|-id=767 bgcolor=#fefefe
| 410767 ||  || — || February 28, 2009 || Kitt Peak || Spacewatch || — || align=right data-sort-value="0.86" | 860 m || 
|-id=768 bgcolor=#E9E9E9
| 410768 ||  || — || February 27, 2009 || Mount Lemmon || Mount Lemmon Survey || (5) || align=right data-sort-value="0.79" | 790 m || 
|-id=769 bgcolor=#fefefe
| 410769 || 2009 EG || — || March 1, 2009 || Tzec Maun || F. Tozzi || PHO || align=right | 2.1 km || 
|-id=770 bgcolor=#fefefe
| 410770 ||  || — || March 2, 2009 || Calvin-Rehoboth || Calvin–Rehoboth Obs. || — || align=right data-sort-value="0.91" | 910 m || 
|-id=771 bgcolor=#fefefe
| 410771 ||  || — || March 1, 2009 || Great Shefford || P. Birtwhistle || — || align=right data-sort-value="0.78" | 780 m || 
|-id=772 bgcolor=#d6d6d6
| 410772 ||  || — || March 1, 2009 || Kitt Peak || Spacewatch || — || align=right | 2.0 km || 
|-id=773 bgcolor=#fefefe
| 410773 ||  || — || March 1, 2009 || Kitt Peak || Spacewatch || MAS || align=right data-sort-value="0.57" | 570 m || 
|-id=774 bgcolor=#fefefe
| 410774 ||  || — || January 31, 2009 || Kitt Peak || Spacewatch || MAS || align=right data-sort-value="0.72" | 720 m || 
|-id=775 bgcolor=#fefefe
| 410775 ||  || — || February 5, 2009 || Kitt Peak || Spacewatch || — || align=right data-sort-value="0.76" | 760 m || 
|-id=776 bgcolor=#fefefe
| 410776 ||  || — || March 15, 2009 || Kitt Peak || Spacewatch || — || align=right data-sort-value="0.77" | 770 m || 
|-id=777 bgcolor=#FFC2E0
| 410777 || 2009 FD || — || February 24, 2009 || Kitt Peak || Spacewatch || APOmoon || align=right data-sort-value="0.47" | 470 m || 
|-id=778 bgcolor=#FFC2E0
| 410778 ||  || — || March 21, 2009 || Mount Lemmon || Mount Lemmon Survey || APO +1kmPHAcritical || align=right | 1.5 km || 
|-id=779 bgcolor=#d6d6d6
| 410779 ||  || — || March 20, 2009 || Bergisch Gladbac || W. Bickel || — || align=right | 2.6 km || 
|-id=780 bgcolor=#fefefe
| 410780 ||  || — || March 17, 2009 || Catalina || CSS || — || align=right | 1.2 km || 
|-id=781 bgcolor=#fefefe
| 410781 ||  || — || January 31, 2009 || Mount Lemmon || Mount Lemmon Survey || NYS || align=right data-sort-value="0.79" | 790 m || 
|-id=782 bgcolor=#fefefe
| 410782 ||  || — || March 20, 2009 || La Sagra || OAM Obs. || — || align=right data-sort-value="0.83" | 830 m || 
|-id=783 bgcolor=#fefefe
| 410783 ||  || — || February 20, 2009 || Kitt Peak || Spacewatch || V || align=right data-sort-value="0.74" | 740 m || 
|-id=784 bgcolor=#E9E9E9
| 410784 ||  || — || March 16, 2009 || Kitt Peak || Spacewatch || — || align=right | 1.1 km || 
|-id=785 bgcolor=#fefefe
| 410785 ||  || — || October 30, 2008 || Mount Lemmon || Mount Lemmon Survey || — || align=right data-sort-value="0.86" | 860 m || 
|-id=786 bgcolor=#fefefe
| 410786 ||  || — || March 19, 2009 || Mount Lemmon || Mount Lemmon Survey || — || align=right data-sort-value="0.80" | 800 m || 
|-id=787 bgcolor=#E9E9E9
| 410787 ||  || — || March 21, 2009 || Catalina || CSS || — || align=right | 2.0 km || 
|-id=788 bgcolor=#E9E9E9
| 410788 ||  || — || March 27, 2009 || Siding Spring || SSS || — || align=right | 1.4 km || 
|-id=789 bgcolor=#E9E9E9
| 410789 ||  || — || March 2, 2009 || Mount Lemmon || Mount Lemmon Survey || — || align=right | 1.6 km || 
|-id=790 bgcolor=#fefefe
| 410790 ||  || — || February 2, 2005 || Kitt Peak || Spacewatch || V || align=right data-sort-value="0.71" | 710 m || 
|-id=791 bgcolor=#E9E9E9
| 410791 ||  || — || April 17, 2009 || Kitt Peak || Spacewatch || — || align=right | 1.3 km || 
|-id=792 bgcolor=#fefefe
| 410792 ||  || — || March 18, 2009 || Kitt Peak || Spacewatch || NYS || align=right data-sort-value="0.59" | 590 m || 
|-id=793 bgcolor=#E9E9E9
| 410793 ||  || — || April 19, 2009 || Kitt Peak || Spacewatch || — || align=right | 1.8 km || 
|-id=794 bgcolor=#E9E9E9
| 410794 ||  || — || April 19, 2009 || Kitt Peak || Spacewatch || — || align=right | 1.9 km || 
|-id=795 bgcolor=#fefefe
| 410795 ||  || — || April 19, 2009 || Kitt Peak || Spacewatch || — || align=right | 1.1 km || 
|-id=796 bgcolor=#E9E9E9
| 410796 ||  || — || March 21, 2009 || Kitt Peak || Spacewatch || — || align=right | 1.7 km || 
|-id=797 bgcolor=#E9E9E9
| 410797 ||  || — || March 2, 2009 || Mount Lemmon || Mount Lemmon Survey || — || align=right | 1.5 km || 
|-id=798 bgcolor=#E9E9E9
| 410798 ||  || — || March 16, 2009 || Kitt Peak || Spacewatch || — || align=right data-sort-value="0.67" | 670 m || 
|-id=799 bgcolor=#fefefe
| 410799 ||  || — || April 26, 2009 || Kitt Peak || Spacewatch || — || align=right | 1.0 km || 
|-id=800 bgcolor=#fefefe
| 410800 ||  || — || April 26, 2009 || Kitt Peak || Spacewatch || MAS || align=right data-sort-value="0.76" | 760 m || 
|}

410801–410900 

|-bgcolor=#E9E9E9
| 410801 ||  || — || April 28, 2009 || Cerro Burek || Alianza S4 Obs. || — || align=right data-sort-value="0.86" | 860 m || 
|-id=802 bgcolor=#fefefe
| 410802 ||  || — || April 21, 2009 || Mount Lemmon || Mount Lemmon Survey || — || align=right data-sort-value="0.85" | 850 m || 
|-id=803 bgcolor=#fefefe
| 410803 ||  || — || March 31, 2009 || Mount Lemmon || Mount Lemmon Survey || — || align=right | 1.0 km || 
|-id=804 bgcolor=#fefefe
| 410804 ||  || — || May 3, 2009 || Mount Lemmon || Mount Lemmon Survey || — || align=right | 1.2 km || 
|-id=805 bgcolor=#d6d6d6
| 410805 ||  || — || April 17, 2009 || Kitt Peak || Spacewatch || — || align=right | 2.0 km || 
|-id=806 bgcolor=#E9E9E9
| 410806 ||  || — || April 30, 2009 || Kitt Peak || Spacewatch || — || align=right | 1.00 km || 
|-id=807 bgcolor=#E9E9E9
| 410807 ||  || — || May 17, 2009 || La Sagra || OAM Obs. || — || align=right | 2.9 km || 
|-id=808 bgcolor=#E9E9E9
| 410808 ||  || — || February 13, 2009 || Mount Lemmon || Mount Lemmon Survey || — || align=right | 1.4 km || 
|-id=809 bgcolor=#E9E9E9
| 410809 ||  || — || April 17, 2009 || Mount Lemmon || Mount Lemmon Survey || — || align=right | 2.6 km || 
|-id=810 bgcolor=#E9E9E9
| 410810 ||  || — || May 26, 2009 || Kitt Peak || Spacewatch || — || align=right data-sort-value="0.95" | 950 m || 
|-id=811 bgcolor=#E9E9E9
| 410811 ||  || — || January 31, 2009 || Kitt Peak || Spacewatch || — || align=right data-sort-value="0.94" | 940 m || 
|-id=812 bgcolor=#E9E9E9
| 410812 ||  || — || May 1, 2009 || Mount Lemmon || Mount Lemmon Survey || — || align=right | 1.7 km || 
|-id=813 bgcolor=#fefefe
| 410813 ||  || — || May 27, 2009 || Kitt Peak || Spacewatch || — || align=right | 1.1 km || 
|-id=814 bgcolor=#fefefe
| 410814 ||  || — || April 19, 2009 || Kitt Peak || Spacewatch || — || align=right | 1.2 km || 
|-id=815 bgcolor=#E9E9E9
| 410815 ||  || — || May 1, 2009 || Mount Lemmon || Mount Lemmon Survey || BRG || align=right | 1.8 km || 
|-id=816 bgcolor=#E9E9E9
| 410816 ||  || — || April 21, 2009 || Mount Lemmon || Mount Lemmon Survey || — || align=right | 2.2 km || 
|-id=817 bgcolor=#E9E9E9
| 410817 Zaffino || 2009 MN ||  || June 19, 2009 || Wrightwood || J. W. Young || — || align=right | 3.3 km || 
|-id=818 bgcolor=#d6d6d6
| 410818 ||  || — || June 23, 2009 || Mount Lemmon || Mount Lemmon Survey || — || align=right | 2.9 km || 
|-id=819 bgcolor=#E9E9E9
| 410819 ||  || — || July 14, 2009 || Kitt Peak || Spacewatch || — || align=right | 2.4 km || 
|-id=820 bgcolor=#E9E9E9
| 410820 ||  || — || July 25, 2009 || La Sagra || OAM Obs. || — || align=right | 2.8 km || 
|-id=821 bgcolor=#d6d6d6
| 410821 ||  || — || July 26, 2009 || La Sagra || OAM Obs. || — || align=right | 3.1 km || 
|-id=822 bgcolor=#E9E9E9
| 410822 ||  || — || July 27, 2009 || Kitt Peak || Spacewatch || — || align=right | 2.4 km || 
|-id=823 bgcolor=#E9E9E9
| 410823 ||  || — || July 27, 2009 || Kitt Peak || Spacewatch || — || align=right | 2.5 km || 
|-id=824 bgcolor=#E9E9E9
| 410824 ||  || — || July 29, 2009 || La Sagra || OAM Obs. || HNS || align=right | 1.7 km || 
|-id=825 bgcolor=#E9E9E9
| 410825 ||  || — || July 29, 2009 || La Sagra || OAM Obs. || — || align=right | 3.2 km || 
|-id=826 bgcolor=#E9E9E9
| 410826 ||  || — || August 14, 2009 || La Sagra || OAM Obs. || — || align=right | 1.6 km || 
|-id=827 bgcolor=#d6d6d6
| 410827 ||  || — || August 15, 2009 || Kitt Peak || Spacewatch || VER || align=right | 2.7 km || 
|-id=828 bgcolor=#E9E9E9
| 410828 ||  || — || August 15, 2009 || Kitt Peak || Spacewatch ||  || align=right | 2.1 km || 
|-id=829 bgcolor=#E9E9E9
| 410829 ||  || — || August 15, 2009 || Catalina || CSS || — || align=right | 2.4 km || 
|-id=830 bgcolor=#d6d6d6
| 410830 ||  || — || August 1, 2009 || Siding Spring || SSS || — || align=right | 3.1 km || 
|-id=831 bgcolor=#E9E9E9
| 410831 ||  || — || August 17, 2009 || Catalina || CSS || — || align=right | 2.6 km || 
|-id=832 bgcolor=#FFC2E0
| 410832 ||  || — || August 18, 2009 || Siding Spring || SSS || AMO || align=right data-sort-value="0.53" | 530 m || 
|-id=833 bgcolor=#E9E9E9
| 410833 ||  || — || August 17, 2009 || Hibiscus || N. Teamo || — || align=right | 2.3 km || 
|-id=834 bgcolor=#fefefe
| 410834 ||  || — || August 21, 2009 || La Sagra || OAM Obs. || H || align=right data-sort-value="0.62" | 620 m || 
|-id=835 bgcolor=#E9E9E9
| 410835 Neszmerak ||  ||  || August 20, 2009 || Gaisberg || R. Gierlinger || — || align=right | 2.0 km || 
|-id=836 bgcolor=#d6d6d6
| 410836 ||  || — || July 14, 2009 || Kitt Peak || Spacewatch || — || align=right | 1.9 km || 
|-id=837 bgcolor=#d6d6d6
| 410837 ||  || — || June 23, 2009 || Mount Lemmon || Mount Lemmon Survey || — || align=right | 2.3 km || 
|-id=838 bgcolor=#E9E9E9
| 410838 ||  || — || September 24, 2000 || Socorro || LINEAR || — || align=right | 3.1 km || 
|-id=839 bgcolor=#d6d6d6
| 410839 ||  || — || August 16, 2009 || Kitt Peak || Spacewatch || — || align=right | 2.4 km || 
|-id=840 bgcolor=#E9E9E9
| 410840 ||  || — || August 31, 2009 || Siding Spring || SSS || — || align=right | 2.5 km || 
|-id=841 bgcolor=#E9E9E9
| 410841 ||  || — || August 16, 2009 || Kitt Peak || Spacewatch || — || align=right | 2.2 km || 
|-id=842 bgcolor=#d6d6d6
| 410842 ||  || — || August 27, 2009 || Kitt Peak || Spacewatch || — || align=right | 3.5 km || 
|-id=843 bgcolor=#d6d6d6
| 410843 ||  || — || September 12, 2009 || Kitt Peak || Spacewatch || — || align=right | 2.5 km || 
|-id=844 bgcolor=#d6d6d6
| 410844 ||  || — || September 12, 2009 || Kitt Peak || Spacewatch || — || align=right | 3.5 km || 
|-id=845 bgcolor=#d6d6d6
| 410845 ||  || — || September 12, 2009 || Kitt Peak || Spacewatch || — || align=right | 2.9 km || 
|-id=846 bgcolor=#d6d6d6
| 410846 ||  || — || September 12, 2009 || Kitt Peak || Spacewatch || — || align=right | 2.1 km || 
|-id=847 bgcolor=#d6d6d6
| 410847 ||  || — || September 12, 2009 || Kitt Peak || Spacewatch || — || align=right | 2.7 km || 
|-id=848 bgcolor=#d6d6d6
| 410848 ||  || — || September 12, 2009 || Kitt Peak || Spacewatch || KOR || align=right | 1.6 km || 
|-id=849 bgcolor=#d6d6d6
| 410849 ||  || — || September 14, 2009 || Kitt Peak || Spacewatch || EOS || align=right | 2.0 km || 
|-id=850 bgcolor=#d6d6d6
| 410850 ||  || — || September 14, 2009 || Kitt Peak || Spacewatch || — || align=right | 2.9 km || 
|-id=851 bgcolor=#d6d6d6
| 410851 ||  || — || September 14, 2009 || Kitt Peak || Spacewatch || EOS || align=right | 1.9 km || 
|-id=852 bgcolor=#d6d6d6
| 410852 ||  || — || September 14, 2009 || Kitt Peak || Spacewatch || — || align=right | 2.0 km || 
|-id=853 bgcolor=#d6d6d6
| 410853 ||  || — || August 17, 2009 || Catalina || CSS || — || align=right | 3.0 km || 
|-id=854 bgcolor=#d6d6d6
| 410854 ||  || — || September 15, 2009 || Kitt Peak || Spacewatch || — || align=right | 2.7 km || 
|-id=855 bgcolor=#d6d6d6
| 410855 ||  || — || September 15, 2009 || Kitt Peak || Spacewatch || — || align=right | 3.0 km || 
|-id=856 bgcolor=#d6d6d6
| 410856 ||  || — || September 15, 2009 || Kitt Peak || Spacewatch || EOS || align=right | 2.0 km || 
|-id=857 bgcolor=#d6d6d6
| 410857 ||  || — || September 15, 2009 || Kitt Peak || Spacewatch || — || align=right | 3.5 km || 
|-id=858 bgcolor=#d6d6d6
| 410858 ||  || — || September 15, 2009 || Kitt Peak || Spacewatch || — || align=right | 3.1 km || 
|-id=859 bgcolor=#d6d6d6
| 410859 ||  || — || September 15, 2009 || Kitt Peak || Spacewatch || — || align=right | 3.7 km || 
|-id=860 bgcolor=#d6d6d6
| 410860 ||  || — || September 15, 2009 || Kitt Peak || Spacewatch || — || align=right | 2.7 km || 
|-id=861 bgcolor=#d6d6d6
| 410861 ||  || — || September 15, 2009 || Kitt Peak || Spacewatch || — || align=right | 2.6 km || 
|-id=862 bgcolor=#d6d6d6
| 410862 ||  || — || September 15, 2009 || Kitt Peak || Spacewatch || — || align=right | 3.9 km || 
|-id=863 bgcolor=#d6d6d6
| 410863 ||  || — || September 12, 2009 || Kitt Peak || Spacewatch || EOS || align=right | 1.6 km || 
|-id=864 bgcolor=#d6d6d6
| 410864 ||  || — || September 15, 2009 || Kitt Peak || Spacewatch || — || align=right | 2.3 km || 
|-id=865 bgcolor=#d6d6d6
| 410865 ||  || — || September 15, 2009 || Kitt Peak || Spacewatch || — || align=right | 2.8 km || 
|-id=866 bgcolor=#d6d6d6
| 410866 ||  || — || September 15, 2009 || Kitt Peak || Spacewatch || — || align=right | 2.3 km || 
|-id=867 bgcolor=#d6d6d6
| 410867 ||  || — || September 15, 2009 || Kitt Peak || Spacewatch || — || align=right | 4.6 km || 
|-id=868 bgcolor=#d6d6d6
| 410868 ||  || — || September 15, 2009 || Kitt Peak || Spacewatch || — || align=right | 2.7 km || 
|-id=869 bgcolor=#d6d6d6
| 410869 ||  || — || September 16, 2009 || Mount Lemmon || Mount Lemmon Survey || BRA || align=right | 1.4 km || 
|-id=870 bgcolor=#d6d6d6
| 410870 ||  || — || April 18, 2007 || Mount Lemmon || Mount Lemmon Survey || — || align=right | 2.9 km || 
|-id=871 bgcolor=#d6d6d6
| 410871 ||  || — || September 18, 2009 || Catalina || CSS || — || align=right | 3.8 km || 
|-id=872 bgcolor=#E9E9E9
| 410872 ||  || — || September 16, 2009 || Kitt Peak || Spacewatch || — || align=right | 2.3 km || 
|-id=873 bgcolor=#d6d6d6
| 410873 ||  || — || September 16, 2009 || Kitt Peak || Spacewatch || EOS || align=right | 2.2 km || 
|-id=874 bgcolor=#d6d6d6
| 410874 ||  || — || September 16, 2009 || Mount Lemmon || Mount Lemmon Survey || — || align=right | 2.1 km || 
|-id=875 bgcolor=#d6d6d6
| 410875 ||  || — || September 16, 2009 || Kitt Peak || Spacewatch || — || align=right | 3.5 km || 
|-id=876 bgcolor=#d6d6d6
| 410876 ||  || — || September 16, 2009 || Kitt Peak || Spacewatch || — || align=right | 3.1 km || 
|-id=877 bgcolor=#d6d6d6
| 410877 ||  || — || September 16, 2009 || Kitt Peak || Spacewatch || — || align=right | 3.7 km || 
|-id=878 bgcolor=#d6d6d6
| 410878 ||  || — || September 16, 2009 || Kitt Peak || Spacewatch || — || align=right | 2.1 km || 
|-id=879 bgcolor=#d6d6d6
| 410879 ||  || — || September 16, 2009 || Kitt Peak || Spacewatch || EOS || align=right | 1.8 km || 
|-id=880 bgcolor=#d6d6d6
| 410880 ||  || — || September 16, 2009 || Kitt Peak || Spacewatch || — || align=right | 2.6 km || 
|-id=881 bgcolor=#d6d6d6
| 410881 ||  || — || September 16, 2009 || Kitt Peak || Spacewatch || — || align=right | 3.9 km || 
|-id=882 bgcolor=#d6d6d6
| 410882 ||  || — || September 16, 2009 || Kitt Peak || Spacewatch || EOS || align=right | 4.1 km || 
|-id=883 bgcolor=#d6d6d6
| 410883 ||  || — || September 16, 2009 || Kitt Peak || Spacewatch || EOS || align=right | 2.1 km || 
|-id=884 bgcolor=#d6d6d6
| 410884 ||  || — || September 16, 2009 || Mount Lemmon || Mount Lemmon Survey || — || align=right | 3.2 km || 
|-id=885 bgcolor=#d6d6d6
| 410885 ||  || — || September 17, 2009 || Mount Lemmon || Mount Lemmon Survey || EOS || align=right | 1.7 km || 
|-id=886 bgcolor=#d6d6d6
| 410886 ||  || — || September 17, 2009 || Kitt Peak || Spacewatch || — || align=right | 3.5 km || 
|-id=887 bgcolor=#d6d6d6
| 410887 ||  || — || September 17, 2009 || Kitt Peak || Spacewatch || — || align=right | 2.9 km || 
|-id=888 bgcolor=#d6d6d6
| 410888 ||  || — || September 17, 2009 || Kitt Peak || Spacewatch || — || align=right | 2.1 km || 
|-id=889 bgcolor=#d6d6d6
| 410889 ||  || — || September 17, 2009 || Kitt Peak || Spacewatch || — || align=right | 3.4 km || 
|-id=890 bgcolor=#E9E9E9
| 410890 ||  || — || September 17, 2009 || Kitt Peak || Spacewatch || — || align=right | 2.8 km || 
|-id=891 bgcolor=#d6d6d6
| 410891 ||  || — || September 17, 2009 || Mount Lemmon || Mount Lemmon Survey || — || align=right | 2.0 km || 
|-id=892 bgcolor=#d6d6d6
| 410892 ||  || — || August 15, 2009 || Kitt Peak || Spacewatch || — || align=right | 3.4 km || 
|-id=893 bgcolor=#d6d6d6
| 410893 ||  || — || September 17, 2009 || Kitt Peak || Spacewatch || — || align=right | 2.3 km || 
|-id=894 bgcolor=#d6d6d6
| 410894 ||  || — || September 17, 2009 || Kitt Peak || Spacewatch || — || align=right | 3.0 km || 
|-id=895 bgcolor=#d6d6d6
| 410895 ||  || — || September 18, 2009 || Kitt Peak || Spacewatch || — || align=right | 2.5 km || 
|-id=896 bgcolor=#d6d6d6
| 410896 ||  || — || October 7, 2004 || Kitt Peak || Spacewatch || — || align=right | 2.3 km || 
|-id=897 bgcolor=#d6d6d6
| 410897 ||  || — || September 18, 2009 || Kitt Peak || Spacewatch || — || align=right | 3.7 km || 
|-id=898 bgcolor=#d6d6d6
| 410898 ||  || — || September 18, 2009 || Kitt Peak || Spacewatch || — || align=right | 2.6 km || 
|-id=899 bgcolor=#d6d6d6
| 410899 ||  || — || September 18, 2009 || Kitt Peak || Spacewatch || — || align=right | 2.7 km || 
|-id=900 bgcolor=#d6d6d6
| 410900 ||  || — || September 18, 2009 || Kitt Peak || Spacewatch || — || align=right | 2.8 km || 
|}

410901–411000 

|-bgcolor=#d6d6d6
| 410901 ||  || — || November 4, 2004 || Kitt Peak || Spacewatch || EOS || align=right | 1.6 km || 
|-id=902 bgcolor=#d6d6d6
| 410902 ||  || — || September 18, 2009 || Kitt Peak || Spacewatch || — || align=right | 2.6 km || 
|-id=903 bgcolor=#d6d6d6
| 410903 ||  || — || September 18, 2009 || Kitt Peak || Spacewatch || — || align=right | 3.7 km || 
|-id=904 bgcolor=#d6d6d6
| 410904 ||  || — || September 18, 2009 || Kitt Peak || Spacewatch || — || align=right | 3.4 km || 
|-id=905 bgcolor=#d6d6d6
| 410905 ||  || — || September 19, 2009 || Kitt Peak || Spacewatch || — || align=right | 2.4 km || 
|-id=906 bgcolor=#d6d6d6
| 410906 ||  || — || September 19, 2009 || Kitt Peak || Spacewatch || — || align=right | 2.5 km || 
|-id=907 bgcolor=#d6d6d6
| 410907 ||  || — || October 23, 2004 || Kitt Peak || Spacewatch || — || align=right | 2.3 km || 
|-id=908 bgcolor=#d6d6d6
| 410908 ||  || — || September 20, 2009 || Kitt Peak || Spacewatch || TIR || align=right | 3.7 km || 
|-id=909 bgcolor=#d6d6d6
| 410909 ||  || — || September 20, 2009 || Kitt Peak || Spacewatch || TIR || align=right | 3.1 km || 
|-id=910 bgcolor=#d6d6d6
| 410910 ||  || — || September 22, 2009 || Kitt Peak || Spacewatch || — || align=right | 2.0 km || 
|-id=911 bgcolor=#d6d6d6
| 410911 ||  || — || September 17, 2009 || Kitt Peak || Spacewatch || — || align=right | 2.2 km || 
|-id=912 bgcolor=#d6d6d6
| 410912 Lisakaroline ||  ||  || September 26, 2009 || Redshed || H. Bachleitner || — || align=right | 1.5 km || 
|-id=913 bgcolor=#d6d6d6
| 410913 ||  || — || April 11, 2007 || Mount Lemmon || Mount Lemmon Survey || — || align=right | 3.1 km || 
|-id=914 bgcolor=#d6d6d6
| 410914 ||  || — || September 21, 2009 || Mount Lemmon || Mount Lemmon Survey || KOR || align=right | 1.3 km || 
|-id=915 bgcolor=#d6d6d6
| 410915 ||  || — || August 27, 2009 || Kitt Peak || Spacewatch || — || align=right | 2.3 km || 
|-id=916 bgcolor=#d6d6d6
| 410916 ||  || — || September 21, 2009 || Kitt Peak || Spacewatch || — || align=right | 2.9 km || 
|-id=917 bgcolor=#d6d6d6
| 410917 ||  || — || September 21, 2009 || Kitt Peak || Spacewatch || — || align=right | 2.4 km || 
|-id=918 bgcolor=#d6d6d6
| 410918 ||  || — || September 22, 2009 || Kitt Peak || Spacewatch || — || align=right | 2.9 km || 
|-id=919 bgcolor=#d6d6d6
| 410919 ||  || — || September 22, 2009 || Kitt Peak || Spacewatch || — || align=right | 4.1 km || 
|-id=920 bgcolor=#d6d6d6
| 410920 ||  || — || September 15, 2009 || Kitt Peak || Spacewatch || EOS || align=right | 3.5 km || 
|-id=921 bgcolor=#d6d6d6
| 410921 ||  || — || September 23, 2009 || Kitt Peak || Spacewatch ||  || align=right | 3.7 km || 
|-id=922 bgcolor=#d6d6d6
| 410922 ||  || — || September 26, 2009 || Mount Lemmon || Mount Lemmon Survey || — || align=right | 1.9 km || 
|-id=923 bgcolor=#d6d6d6
| 410923 ||  || — || August 17, 2009 || Kitt Peak || Spacewatch || EOS || align=right | 1.7 km || 
|-id=924 bgcolor=#d6d6d6
| 410924 ||  || — || September 19, 2009 || Kitt Peak || Spacewatch || EOS || align=right | 1.8 km || 
|-id=925 bgcolor=#d6d6d6
| 410925 ||  || — || September 19, 2009 || Kitt Peak || Spacewatch || LIX || align=right | 3.4 km || 
|-id=926 bgcolor=#E9E9E9
| 410926 ||  || — || April 29, 2003 || Kitt Peak || Spacewatch || — || align=right | 2.5 km || 
|-id=927 bgcolor=#d6d6d6
| 410927 ||  || — || September 17, 2009 || Catalina || CSS || — || align=right | 3.2 km || 
|-id=928 bgcolor=#d6d6d6
| 410928 Maidbronn ||  ||  || September 28, 2009 || Maidbronn || B. Häusler || — || align=right | 2.7 km || 
|-id=929 bgcolor=#d6d6d6
| 410929 ||  || — || September 20, 2009 || Kitt Peak || Spacewatch || — || align=right | 2.5 km || 
|-id=930 bgcolor=#d6d6d6
| 410930 ||  || — || September 25, 2009 || Kitt Peak || Spacewatch || critical || align=right | 2.4 km || 
|-id=931 bgcolor=#d6d6d6
| 410931 ||  || — || September 16, 2009 || Kitt Peak || Spacewatch || EOS || align=right | 1.7 km || 
|-id=932 bgcolor=#d6d6d6
| 410932 ||  || — || September 23, 2009 || Mount Lemmon || Mount Lemmon Survey || — || align=right | 3.0 km || 
|-id=933 bgcolor=#E9E9E9
| 410933 ||  || — || September 23, 2009 || Mount Lemmon || Mount Lemmon Survey || — || align=right | 3.1 km || 
|-id=934 bgcolor=#d6d6d6
| 410934 ||  || — || September 12, 2009 || Kitt Peak || Spacewatch || — || align=right | 2.7 km || 
|-id=935 bgcolor=#d6d6d6
| 410935 ||  || — || September 24, 2009 || Kitt Peak || Spacewatch || BRA || align=right | 1.7 km || 
|-id=936 bgcolor=#d6d6d6
| 410936 ||  || — || September 20, 2009 || Kitt Peak || Spacewatch || — || align=right | 2.6 km || 
|-id=937 bgcolor=#FA8072
| 410937 ||  || — || September 24, 2009 || Kitt Peak || Spacewatch || H || align=right data-sort-value="0.54" | 540 m || 
|-id=938 bgcolor=#d6d6d6
| 410938 ||  || — || September 25, 2009 || Kitt Peak || Spacewatch || ELF || align=right | 3.8 km || 
|-id=939 bgcolor=#d6d6d6
| 410939 ||  || — || September 17, 2009 || Kitt Peak || Spacewatch || — || align=right | 3.0 km || 
|-id=940 bgcolor=#d6d6d6
| 410940 ||  || — || September 25, 2009 || Mount Lemmon || Mount Lemmon Survey || KOR || align=right | 1.2 km || 
|-id=941 bgcolor=#d6d6d6
| 410941 ||  || — || September 25, 2009 || Kitt Peak || Spacewatch || — || align=right | 2.5 km || 
|-id=942 bgcolor=#d6d6d6
| 410942 ||  || — || September 25, 2009 || Kitt Peak || Spacewatch || — || align=right | 3.3 km || 
|-id=943 bgcolor=#d6d6d6
| 410943 ||  || — || September 27, 2009 || Kitt Peak || Spacewatch || — || align=right | 3.2 km || 
|-id=944 bgcolor=#d6d6d6
| 410944 ||  || — || September 15, 2009 || Kitt Peak || Spacewatch || KOR || align=right | 1.4 km || 
|-id=945 bgcolor=#d6d6d6
| 410945 ||  || — || September 28, 2009 || Kitt Peak || Spacewatch || — || align=right | 2.8 km || 
|-id=946 bgcolor=#d6d6d6
| 410946 ||  || — || September 18, 2009 || Mount Lemmon || Mount Lemmon Survey || KOR || align=right | 1.3 km || 
|-id=947 bgcolor=#E9E9E9
| 410947 ||  || — || August 28, 2009 || Kitt Peak || Spacewatch || — || align=right | 2.3 km || 
|-id=948 bgcolor=#d6d6d6
| 410948 ||  || — || September 25, 2009 || Catalina || CSS || — || align=right | 3.9 km || 
|-id=949 bgcolor=#E9E9E9
| 410949 ||  || — || September 16, 2009 || Mount Lemmon || Mount Lemmon Survey || — || align=right | 3.1 km || 
|-id=950 bgcolor=#d6d6d6
| 410950 ||  || — || October 4, 2004 || Kitt Peak || Spacewatch || — || align=right | 2.1 km || 
|-id=951 bgcolor=#fefefe
| 410951 ||  || — || January 15, 2005 || Catalina || CSS || H || align=right data-sort-value="0.62" | 620 m || 
|-id=952 bgcolor=#d6d6d6
| 410952 ||  || — || September 16, 2009 || Kitt Peak || Spacewatch || — || align=right | 3.0 km || 
|-id=953 bgcolor=#d6d6d6
| 410953 ||  || — || September 19, 2009 || Kitt Peak || Spacewatch || — || align=right | 2.8 km || 
|-id=954 bgcolor=#d6d6d6
| 410954 ||  || — || September 17, 2009 || Kitt Peak || Spacewatch || EOS || align=right | 1.7 km || 
|-id=955 bgcolor=#d6d6d6
| 410955 ||  || — || September 21, 2009 || Mount Lemmon || Mount Lemmon Survey || — || align=right | 2.8 km || 
|-id=956 bgcolor=#d6d6d6
| 410956 ||  || — || September 23, 2009 || Kitt Peak || Spacewatch || — || align=right | 2.8 km || 
|-id=957 bgcolor=#d6d6d6
| 410957 ||  || — || September 18, 2009 || Kitt Peak || Spacewatch || VER || align=right | 2.8 km || 
|-id=958 bgcolor=#d6d6d6
| 410958 ||  || — || September 20, 2009 || Kitt Peak || Spacewatch || — || align=right | 2.7 km || 
|-id=959 bgcolor=#d6d6d6
| 410959 ||  || — || September 27, 2009 || Kitt Peak || Spacewatch || — || align=right | 2.6 km || 
|-id=960 bgcolor=#d6d6d6
| 410960 ||  || — || September 19, 2009 || Kitt Peak || Spacewatch || — || align=right | 3.7 km || 
|-id=961 bgcolor=#d6d6d6
| 410961 ||  || — || September 18, 2009 || Kitt Peak || Spacewatch || — || align=right | 2.6 km || 
|-id=962 bgcolor=#d6d6d6
| 410962 ||  || — || September 17, 2009 || Kitt Peak || Spacewatch || — || align=right | 1.8 km || 
|-id=963 bgcolor=#d6d6d6
| 410963 ||  || — || September 17, 2009 || Kitt Peak || Spacewatch || EOS || align=right | 2.0 km || 
|-id=964 bgcolor=#d6d6d6
| 410964 ||  || — || September 21, 2009 || Mount Lemmon || Mount Lemmon Survey || — || align=right | 1.9 km || 
|-id=965 bgcolor=#d6d6d6
| 410965 ||  || — || October 13, 2009 || Tzec Maun || E. Schwab || — || align=right | 2.7 km || 
|-id=966 bgcolor=#d6d6d6
| 410966 ||  || — || October 13, 2009 || La Sagra || OAM Obs. || — || align=right | 3.4 km || 
|-id=967 bgcolor=#d6d6d6
| 410967 ||  || — || October 1, 2009 || Mount Lemmon || Mount Lemmon Survey || BRA || align=right | 2.4 km || 
|-id=968 bgcolor=#d6d6d6
| 410968 ||  || — || October 14, 2009 || Bisei SG Center || BATTeRS || — || align=right | 4.0 km || 
|-id=969 bgcolor=#d6d6d6
| 410969 ||  || — || October 14, 2009 || Catalina || CSS || EOS || align=right | 2.2 km || 
|-id=970 bgcolor=#d6d6d6
| 410970 ||  || — || September 20, 2009 || Mount Lemmon || Mount Lemmon Survey || — || align=right | 2.7 km || 
|-id=971 bgcolor=#d6d6d6
| 410971 ||  || — || October 11, 2009 || Mount Lemmon || Mount Lemmon Survey || — || align=right | 3.4 km || 
|-id=972 bgcolor=#d6d6d6
| 410972 ||  || — || October 14, 2009 || La Sagra || OAM Obs. || — || align=right | 3.0 km || 
|-id=973 bgcolor=#d6d6d6
| 410973 ||  || — || October 14, 2009 || Catalina || CSS || — || align=right | 3.0 km || 
|-id=974 bgcolor=#d6d6d6
| 410974 ||  || — || October 14, 2009 || Catalina || CSS || — || align=right | 2.2 km || 
|-id=975 bgcolor=#d6d6d6
| 410975 ||  || — || September 14, 2009 || Kitt Peak || Spacewatch || — || align=right | 3.8 km || 
|-id=976 bgcolor=#d6d6d6
| 410976 ||  || — || October 14, 2009 || Kitt Peak || Spacewatch || — || align=right | 3.6 km || 
|-id=977 bgcolor=#d6d6d6
| 410977 ||  || — || October 11, 2009 || Mount Lemmon || Mount Lemmon Survey || VER || align=right | 2.9 km || 
|-id=978 bgcolor=#d6d6d6
| 410978 ||  || — || October 14, 2009 || Kitt Peak || Spacewatch || — || align=right | 2.4 km || 
|-id=979 bgcolor=#d6d6d6
| 410979 ||  || — || October 1, 2009 || Kitt Peak || Spacewatch || THM || align=right | 2.2 km || 
|-id=980 bgcolor=#d6d6d6
| 410980 ||  || — || October 14, 2009 || Catalina || CSS || — || align=right | 2.4 km || 
|-id=981 bgcolor=#d6d6d6
| 410981 ||  || — || October 12, 2009 || La Sagra || OAM Obs. || — || align=right | 2.7 km || 
|-id=982 bgcolor=#d6d6d6
| 410982 ||  || — || October 6, 2005 || Mount Lemmon || Mount Lemmon Survey || — || align=right | 3.4 km || 
|-id=983 bgcolor=#d6d6d6
| 410983 ||  || — || October 17, 2009 || Tzec Maun || Tzec Maun Obs. || — || align=right | 4.1 km || 
|-id=984 bgcolor=#d6d6d6
| 410984 ||  || — || October 16, 2009 || Mount Lemmon || Mount Lemmon Survey || — || align=right | 3.6 km || 
|-id=985 bgcolor=#d6d6d6
| 410985 ||  || — || October 17, 2009 || La Sagra || OAM Obs. || — || align=right | 2.9 km || 
|-id=986 bgcolor=#d6d6d6
| 410986 ||  || — || October 14, 2009 || Catalina || CSS || — || align=right | 3.1 km || 
|-id=987 bgcolor=#d6d6d6
| 410987 ||  || — || September 28, 2009 || Mount Lemmon || Mount Lemmon Survey || — || align=right | 1.9 km || 
|-id=988 bgcolor=#d6d6d6
| 410988 ||  || — || October 18, 2009 || Mount Lemmon || Mount Lemmon Survey || — || align=right | 4.7 km || 
|-id=989 bgcolor=#d6d6d6
| 410989 ||  || — || October 18, 2009 || Mount Lemmon || Mount Lemmon Survey || — || align=right | 2.8 km || 
|-id=990 bgcolor=#d6d6d6
| 410990 ||  || — || October 21, 2009 || Catalina || CSS || — || align=right | 3.2 km || 
|-id=991 bgcolor=#d6d6d6
| 410991 ||  || — || October 21, 2009 || Catalina || CSS || — || align=right | 2.3 km || 
|-id=992 bgcolor=#d6d6d6
| 410992 ||  || — || October 18, 2009 || Mount Lemmon || Mount Lemmon Survey || — || align=right | 2.8 km || 
|-id=993 bgcolor=#d6d6d6
| 410993 ||  || — || September 19, 2009 || Mount Lemmon || Mount Lemmon Survey || — || align=right | 4.3 km || 
|-id=994 bgcolor=#d6d6d6
| 410994 ||  || — || October 21, 2009 || Mount Lemmon || Mount Lemmon Survey || — || align=right | 3.4 km || 
|-id=995 bgcolor=#d6d6d6
| 410995 ||  || — || October 22, 2009 || Mount Lemmon || Mount Lemmon Survey || EOS || align=right | 1.9 km || 
|-id=996 bgcolor=#d6d6d6
| 410996 ||  || — || October 22, 2009 || Mount Lemmon || Mount Lemmon Survey || — || align=right | 3.4 km || 
|-id=997 bgcolor=#d6d6d6
| 410997 ||  || — || October 22, 2009 || Catalina || CSS || — || align=right | 4.9 km || 
|-id=998 bgcolor=#d6d6d6
| 410998 ||  || — || October 18, 2009 || Mount Lemmon || Mount Lemmon Survey || — || align=right | 2.3 km || 
|-id=999 bgcolor=#d6d6d6
| 410999 ||  || — || September 23, 2009 || Kitt Peak || Spacewatch || — || align=right | 4.1 km || 
|-id=000 bgcolor=#d6d6d6
| 411000 ||  || — || September 22, 2009 || Mount Lemmon || Mount Lemmon Survey || — || align=right | 2.7 km || 
|}

References

External links 
 Discovery Circumstances: Numbered Minor Planets (410001)–(415000) (IAU Minor Planet Center)

0410